

Deaths in March

 4: Frank Chirkinian
 21: Nikolai Andrianov
 31: Claudia Heill

Current sporting seasons

Australian rules football 2011
Australian Football League

Auto racing 2011
Formula One
Sprint Cup
Nationwide Series
Camping World Truck Series
IRL IndyCar Series
World Rally Championship
WTTC
V8 Supercar
GP2 Asia Series
Rolex Sports Car Series

Baseball 2011
Major League Baseball

Basketball 2011
NBA
NCAA Division I men
NCAA Division I women
Euroleague
EuroLeague Women
Eurocup
EuroChallenge
France
Germany
Greece
Israel
Italy
Philippines
Commissioner's Cup
Russia
Spain
Turkey

Darts 2011
Premier League

Football (soccer) 2011
National teams competitions
UEFA Euro 2012 qualifying
2012 Africa Cup of Nations qualification
International clubs competitions
UEFA (Europe) Champions League
UEFA Europa League
UEFA Women's Champions League
Copa Libertadores (South America)
AFC (Asia) Champions League
AFC Cup
CAF (Africa) Champions League
CAF Confederation Cup
CONCACAF (North & Central America) Champions League
OFC (Oceania) Champions League
Domestic (national) competitions
Argentina
England
France
Germany
Iran
Italy
Japan
Norway
Portugal
Russia
Scotland
Spain
Major League Soccer (USA & Canada)

Golf 2011
PGA Tour
European Tour
LPGA Tour
Champions Tour

Ice hockey 2011
National Hockey League
Kontinental Hockey League
Czech Extraliga
Elitserien
Canadian Hockey League:
OHL, QMJHL, WHL
NCAA Division I men
NCAA Division I women

Motorcycle racing 2011
Superbike World Championship
Supersport World Championship

Rugby league 2011
Super League
NRL

Rugby union 2011
Heineken Cup
European Challenge Cup
English Premiership
Celtic League
LV Cup
Top 14
Super Rugby 
Sevens World Series

Snooker 2011
Players Tour Championship

Tennis 2011
ATP World Tour
WTA Tour

Volleyball 2011
International clubs competitions
Men's CEV Champions League
Women's CEV Champions League
Domestic (national) competitions
Iranian Men's Super League
Philippine collegiate (UAAP)

Winter sports
Alpine Skiing World Cup
Biathlon World Cup
Cross-Country Skiing World Cup
Freestyle Skiing World Cup
Nordic Combined World Cup
Ski Jumping World Cup
Snowboard World Cup
Speed Skating World Cup

Days of the month

March 31, 2011 (Thursday)

Baseball
MLB season opening games:
American League:
New York Yankees 6, Detroit Tigers 3
Los Angeles Angels of Anaheim 4, Kansas City Royals 2
National League:
Atlanta Braves 2, Washington Nationals 0
Cincinnati Reds 7, Milwaukee Brewers 6
San Diego Padres 5, St. Louis Cardinals 3 (11 innings)
Los Angeles Dodgers 2, San Francisco Giants 1

Basketball
Euroleague Quarterfinals, game 4: (best-of-5 series)
Maccabi Tel Aviv  99–77  Caja Laboral. Maccabi Tel Aviv win series 3–1.
Panathinaikos BC  78–67  Regal FC Barcelona. Panathinaikos win series 3–1.
Power Electronics Valencia  81–72  Real Madrid. Series tied 2–2.
Montepaschi Siena  88–76  Olympiacos Piraeus. Montepaschi Siena win series 3–1.
National Invitation Tournament Final in New York City:
Wichita State 66, Alabama 57

Darts
Premier League, week 8 in Cardiff, Wales:
James Wade  6–8 Gary Anderson 
Simon Whitlock  8–3 Terry Jenkins 
Phil Taylor  8–3 Raymond van Barneveld 
Adrian Lewis  8–1 Mark Webster 
Standings (after 8 matches): Taylor 14 points, Anderson, van Barneveld 10, Lewis 9, Whitlock 8, Jenkins 5, Webster, Wade 4.

Football (soccer)
South American Under-17 Championship in Ecuador:
Final stage:
 1–1 
 2–2 
 1–0 
Standings (after 2 matches): Argentina, Brazil 4 points, Ecuador, Uruguay 2, Paraguay, Colombia 1.
CONCACAF U-20 Championship in Guatemala: (teams in bold advance to the quarterfinals)
Group A:  2–1 
Standings: , Honduras 3 points (1 match), Jamaica 0 (2).
Group B:  3–0 
Standings: , Panama 3 points (1 match), Suriname 0 (2).
Copa Libertadores Second Stage:
Group 8: Peñarol  2–1  Godoy Cruz
Standings: Peñarol 9 points (5 matches), Godoy Cruz 7 (5),  LDU Quito 6 (4),  Independiente 4 (4).

Golf
Women's major:
Kraft Nabisco Championship in Rancho Mirage, California, United States
Leaderboard after first round: (T1) Brittany Lincicome  & Stacy Lewis  66 (−6) (T3) Mika Miyazato  & Sandra Gal  67 (−5)

Snooker
China Open in Beijing, China, last 16:
Stephen Lee  5–2 Ryan Day 
Peter Ebdon  5–1 Neil Robertson 
Mark Davis  2–5 Judd Trump 
Li Hang  4–5 Shaun Murphy 
Stephen Hendry  2–5 Ding Junhui 
John Higgins  5–2 Ricky Walden 
Robert Milkins  1–5 Mark Selby 
Ali Carter  5–3 Marcus Campbell

Wrestling
European Championships in Dortmund, Germany:
Women:
48 kg:  Mariya Stadnik   Khrystyna Daranutsa   Iwona Nina Matkowska  & Cristina Raluca Croitoru 
51 kg:  Yuliya Blahinya   Estera Dobre   Natalia Budu  & Ekatarina Krasnova 
55 kg:  Ida-Theres Karlsson-Nerell   Ludmila Cristea   Maria Gurova  & Katarzyna Krawczyk

March 30, 2011 (Wednesday)

Basketball
Women's National Invitation Tournament Semifinals:
In Toledo, Ohio: Toledo 83, Charlotte 60
In Normal, Illinois: USC 63, Illinois State 36
College Basketball Invitational Final (best-of-3), Game 2 in Eugene, Oregon:
Oregon 71, Creighton 58. Series tied 1–1.
CollegeInsider.com Tournament Final in New Rochelle, New York:
Santa Clara 76, Iona 69
The Broncos win their first national postseason tournament title.

Cricket
World Cup:
Semi-final in Mohali, India:  260/9 (50 overs; Wahab Riaz 5/46);  231 (49.5 overs). India win by 29 runs.
India reach the final for the third time, and first since 2003. Pakistan lose in the semi-finals for the fourth time.

Football (soccer)
CONCACAF U-20 Championship in Guatemala (teams in bold advance to the knockout stage):
Group C:  0–3 
Standings: Costa Rica,  3 points (1 match), Guadeloupe 0 (2).
Group D:  0–0 
Standings:  3 points (1 match), Trinidad and Tobago 1 (1), Cuba 1 (2).
Copa Libertadores Second Stage (teams in bold advance to the knockout stage):
Group 6: Internacional  3–0  Jorge Wilstermann
Standings (after 4 matches): Internacional 10 points,  Emelec 7,  Chiapas 6, Jorge Wilstermann 0.
Group 7:
Deportes Tolima  1–1  Estudiantes
Guaraní  0–2  Cruzeiro
Standings (after 5 matches): Cruzeiro 13 points, Estudiantes 10, Deportes Tolima 5, Guaraní 0.

Snooker
China Open in Beijing, China, last 32:
John Higgins  5–3 Nigel Bond 
Marco Fu  3–5 Judd Trump 
Ali Carter  5–1 Stuart Bingham 
Peter Ebdon  5–2 Gerard Greene 
Ronnie O'Sullivan  2–5 Ryan Day 
Mark Selby  5–3 Tian Pengfei 
Jamie Cope  3–5 Robert Milkins 
Ricky Walden  5–4 Martin Gould

Wrestling
European Championships in Dortmund, Germany:
Men Freestyle:
55 kg:  Djamal Otarsultanov   Vladimer Khinchegashvili   Vladislav Andreev  & Makhmud Magomedov 
66 kg:  Jabrail Hasanov   Leonid Bazan   Adam Batirov  &  
84 kg:  Anzor Urishev   Dato Marsagishvili   Sharif Sharifov  & Gheorghiţă Ştefan 
120 kg:  Fatih Çakıroğlu   Alexei Shemarov   Dániel Ligeti  & Jamaladdin Magomedov

March 29, 2011 (Tuesday)

Basketball
Euroleague Quarterfinals, game 3: (best-of-5 series)
Maccabi Tel Aviv  81–60  Caja Laboral. Maccabi Tel Aviv lead series 2–1.
Panathinaikos BC  76–74  Regal FC Barcelona. Panathinaikos lead series 2–1.
Power Electronics Valencia  66–75  Real Madrid. Real Madrid lead series 2–1.
Montepaschi Siena  81–72  Olympiacos Piraeus. Montepaschi Siena lead series 2–1.
Women's Division I Tournament (seeds in parentheses):
Philadelphia Regional, Regional Final: (1) Connecticut 75, (2) Duke 40
The Huskies advance to their fourth successive Final Four, and their twelfth overall.
Dallas Regional, Regional Final: (2) Texas A&M 58, (1) Baylor 46
The Aggies advance to their first Final Four.
National Invitation Tournament Semifinals in New York City:
Wichita State 75, Washington State 44
Alabama 62, Colorado 61

Cricket
World Cup:
Semi-final in Colombo, Sri Lanka:  217 (48.5 overs);  220/5 (47.5 overs). Sri Lanka win by 5 wickets.
Sri Lanka reach their second consecutive World Cup final, and third overall. New Zealand lose in the semi-finals for the sixth time.

Football (soccer)
UEFA Euro 2012 qualifying, matchday 6:
Group A:
 2–0 
 4–1 
Standings:  15 points (5 matches), Belgium 10 (6), Turkey 9 (5), Austria 7 (5), Azerbaijan 3 (4),  0 (5).
Group C:
 1–1 
 0–0 
Standings:  13 points (5 matches), Slovenia, Serbia 8 (6), Estonia 7 (5), Northern Ireland 6 (5),  1 (5).
Group D:  3–1 
Standings:  12 points (5 matches),  8 (5),  7 (4), Romania 5 (5), Luxembourg 1 (6).
Group E:
 2–1 
 5–3 
Standings: Netherlands 18 points (6 matches), Sweden 9 (4), Hungary 9 (6), Moldova 6 (5),  3 (4),  0 (5).
Group F:  1–0 
Standings:  11 points (5 matches),  10 (5), Israel 10 (6), Georgia 9 (6),  4 (5),  0 (5).
Group I:
 1–3 
 2–0 
Standings: Spain 15 points (5 matches), Czech Republic 9 (5), Lithuania 4 (4), Liechtenstein 0 (4).
Friendly internationals: (top 10 in FIFA World Rankings)
(3)  1–2 
 0–0 (4) 
(6)  1–1 
 2–3 (7) 
 0–0 (8) 
(9)  2–0 
(10)  0–0 
CONCACAF U-20 Championship in Guatemala:
Group A:  2–0 
Group B:  0–4

Snooker
China Open in Beijing, China:
Wild-card round:
Robert Milkins  5–1 Rouzi Maimaiti 
Gerard Greene  5–2 Yu Delu 
Last 32:
Mark Williams  4–5 Stephen Lee 
Stephen Maguire  3–5 Mark Davis 
Ding Junhui  5–4 Kurt Maflin 
Shaun Murphy  5–3 Joe Perry 
Graeme Dott  4–5 Li Hang 
Mark Allen  4–5 Marcus Campbell

Wrestling
European Championships in Dortmund, Germany:
Men Freestyle:
60 kg:  Opan Sat   Sahit Prizreni   Anatoli Guidea  & Vasyl Fedoryshyn 
74 kg:  Denis Tsargush   Musa Murtazaliev   Gábor Hatos  & Davit Khutsishvili 
96 kg:  Khetag Gazyumov   Vladislav Baytsaev   Pavlo Oliinyk  & Nicolai Ceban

March 28, 2011 (Monday)

Basketball
Women's Division I Tournament (seeds in parentheses):
Dayton Regional Final in Dayton, Ohio: (2) Notre Dame 73, (1) Tennessee 59
The Fighting Irish advance to the Final Four for the third time, and the first since winning their only national title in 2001.
Spokane Regional Final in Spokane, Washington: (1) Stanford 83, (11) Gonzaga 60
The Cardinal make their fourth consecutive Final Four, and 10th in all.
College Basketball Invitational Final (best-of-3), Game 1 in Omaha, Nebraska:
Creighton 84, Oregon 76. Creighton leads series 1–0.

Football (soccer)
Africa Cup of Nations qualification, matchday 3:
Group C in Bamako, Mali:  3–0 
Standings (after 3 matches): Libya 7 points,  6,  4, Comoros 0.
South American Under-17 Championship in Ecuador:
Final stage:
 1–0 
 0–0 
 0–0 
CONCACAF U-20 Championship in Guatemala:
Group C:  2–1 
Group D:  0–3

Snooker
China Open in Beijing, China:
Wild-card round:
Kurt Maflin  5–3 Cao Yupeng 
Marcus Campbell  5–3 Mei Xiwen 
Joe Perry  5–2 Li Yan 
Nigel Bond  5–3 Jin Long 
Ken Doherty  1–5 Li Hang 
Last 32:
Stephen Hendry  5–1 Matthew Stevens 
Neil Robertson  5–1 Barry Hawkins

March 27, 2011 (Sunday)

Auto racing
Formula One:
 in Melbourne: (1) Sebastian Vettel  (Red Bull–Renault) (2) Lewis Hamilton  (McLaren–Mercedes) (3) Vitaly Petrov  (Renault)
Sprint Cup Series:
Auto Club 400 in Fontana, California: (1)  Kevin Harvick (Chevrolet; Richard Childress Racing) (2)  Jimmie Johnson (Chevrolet; Hendrick Motorsports) (3)  Kyle Busch (Toyota; Joe Gibbs Racing)
Drivers' championship standings (after 5 of 36 races): (1)  Carl Edwards (Ford; Roush Fenway Racing) 187 points (2)  Ryan Newman (Chevrolet; Stewart Haas Racing) 178 (3)  Kurt Busch (Dodge; Penske Racing) 177
IndyCar Series:
Honda Grand Prix of St. Petersburg in St. Petersburg, Florida: (1) Dario Franchitti  (Chip Ganassi Racing) (2) Will Power  (Team Penske) (3) Tony Kanaan  (KV Racing Technology)
Franchitti takes his 27th American open-wheel win, moving him into the top ten all-time, tied with Johnny Rutherford.
World Rally Championship:
Rally de Portugal in Faro, Portugal: (1) Sébastien Ogier /Julien Ingrassia  (Citroën DS3 WRC) (2) Sébastien Loeb /Daniel Elena  (Citroën DS3 WRC) (3) Jari-Matti Latvala /  (Ford Fiesta RS WRC)
Drivers' championship standings (after 3 of 13 rallies): (1) Mikko Hirvonen  (Ford Fiesta RS WRC) & Loeb 58 points (3) Latvala 48

Basketball
NCAA Division I Men's Tournament (seeds in parentheses):
Southwest Regional Final in San Antonio, Texas: (11) VCU 71, (1) Kansas 61
The Rams become the first CAA representative to reach the Final Four since George Mason in 2006.
East Regional Final in Newark, New Jersey: (4) Kentucky 76, (2) North Carolina 69
The Wildcats reach the Final Four for the 14th time, making their first appearance since winning the national championship in 1998.
Women's Division I Tournament (seeds in parentheses):
Philadelphia Regional Semifinals in Philadelphia, Pennsylvania:
(1) Connecticut 68, (5) Georgetown 63
(2) Duke 70, (3) DePaul 63
Dallas Regional Semifinals in Dallas, Texas:
(2) Texas A&M 79, (6) Georgia 38
(1) Baylor 86, (5) Green Bay 76

Curling
World Women's Championship in Esbjerg, Denmark:
Bronze Medal Game: Denmark  9–10  
Gold Medal Game:  Sweden  7–5 
Sweden win their eighth world title, and first since 2006.
Skip Anette Norberg wins her third world title.

Cycling
UCI Track World Championships in Apeldoorn, Netherlands:
Men's 1km time trial:  Stefan Nimke  1:00.793  Teun Mulder  1:01.179  François Pervis  1:01.228
Nimke wins his third time trial title and fourth world title overall.
Men's madison:  Leigh Howard/Cameron Meyer  8 points  Martin Bláha/Jiri Hochmann  1  Theo Bos/Peter Schep  21 (−1 lap)
Women's omnium:  Tara Whitten  23 points  Sarah Hammer  31  Kirsten Wild  42
Whitten wins her second consecutive omnium title and third world title overall.
Women's keirin:  Anna Meares   Olga Panarina   Clara Sanchez 
Meares wins her third title of the championships and eighth title overall.
UCI World Tour:
Volta a Catalunya, Stage 7:  Samuel Dumoulin  2h 33' 55"  Rigoberto Urán  s.t.  Kenny Dehaes  s.t.
Final general classification: (1) Alberto Contador  29h 24' 42" (2) Michele Scarponi  + 23" (3) Dan Martin  + 35"
Gent–Wevelgem:  Tom Boonen  4h 36' 16"  Daniele Bennati  s.t.  Tyler Farrar  s.t.
World Tour standings (after 6 of 27 races): (1) Matthew Goss  203 points (2) Scarponi 202 (3) Cadel Evans  128

Equestrianism
FEI World Cup Show Jumping:
Western European League, 13th competition in 's-Hertogenbosch (CSI 5*-W):  Denis Lynch  on Abbervail van het Dingeshof  Jeroen Dubbeldam  on Simon  Eric van der Vleuten  on Utascha SFN
Final standings: (1) Kevin Staut  96 points (2) Meredith Michaels-Beerbaum  90 (3) Rodrigo Pessoa  85
Staut, Michaels-Beerbaum and Pessoa along with seventeen other riders qualify for the World Cup Final.
Central European League Final in Warsaw (CSI 2*-W):  Mściwoj Kiecoń  on Urbane  Tiit Kivisild  on Cinnamon  Vladimir Beletsky  on Rocketman
Kiecoń, Kivisild and Beletsky qualify for the World Cup Final.

Football (soccer)
Africa Cup of Nations qualification, matchday 3:
Group B:
 1–1 
 4–0 
Standings (after 3 matches): Guinea 7 points, Nigeria 6, Ethiopia 3, Madagascar 1.
Group C:  0–2 
Standings: Zambia 6 points (3 matches),  4 (2), Mozambique 4 (3),  0 (2).
Group D:  1–0 
Group E:  3–0 
Standings (after 3 matches):  9 points, Congo DR,  4, Mauritius 0.
Group G:  3–1 
Standings (after 3 matches):  7 points, Niger 6, Sierra Leone 2,  1.
Group H:  2–1 
Standings (after 3 matches): Côte d'Ivoire 9 points, Benin 4,  3,  1.
Group I:
 0–3 
 3–0 
Standings (after 3 matches): Ghana, Sudan 7 points, Congo 3, Swaziland 0.
Friendly international: (top 10 in FIFA World Rankings)
 0–2 (5)  in London

Golf
PGA Tour:
Arnold Palmer Invitational in Orlando, Florida:
Winner: Martin Laird  280 (−8)
Laird wins his second PGA Tour title, and becomes the first European winner of the tournament.
European Tour:
Open de Andalucia in Málaga, Spain:
Winner: Paul Lawrie  268 (−12)
Lawrie wins his sixth European Tour title, and first since 2002.
LPGA Tour:
Kia Classic in Industry, California:
Winner: Sandra Gal  276 (−16)
Gal wins her first LPGA Tour title.

Motorcycle racing
Superbike:
Donington Park World Championship round in Castle Donington, England:
Race 1: (1) Marco Melandri  (Yamaha YZF-R1) (2) Jakub Smrž  (Ducati 1198) (3) Carlos Checa  (Ducati 1198)
Race 2: (1) Checa (2) Melandri (3) Leon Camier  (Aprilia RSV4)
Riders' championship standings (after 2 of 13 rounds): (1) Checa 91 points (2) Melandri 72 (3) Leon Haslam  (BMW S1000RR) 53
Supersport:
Donington Park World Championship round in Castle Donington, England: (1) Luca Scassa  (Yamaha YZF-R6) (2) Chaz Davies  (Yamaha YZF-R6) (3) Gino Rea  (Honda CBR600RR)
Riders' championship standings (after 2 of 12 rounds): (1) Scassa 50 points (2) Broc Parkes  (Kawasaki Ninja ZX-6R) 31 (3) Robbin Harms  (Honda CBR600RR) 24

Rugby union
IRB Sevens World Series:
Hong Kong Sevens in Hong Kong:
Shield:  17–12 
Bowl:  12–33 
Plate:  26–19 
Cup:  29–17 
Standings (after 5 of 8 competitions): (1) New Zealand 110 points (2) England 105 (3)  &  84.

Snowboarding
World Cup in Arosa, Switzerland:
Men's parallel giant slalom:  Andreas Prommegger   Roland Fischnaller   Nevin Galmarini 
Final parallel slalom standings: (1) Benjamin Karl  5790 points (2) Prommegger 5740 (3) Fischnaller 5420
Karl wins his second consecutive title, and third overall.
Final speed overall standings: (1) Karl 4950 points (2) Prommegger 4210 (3) Fischnaller 4110
Women's parallel giant slalom:  Fränzi Mägert-Kohli   Yekaterina Tudegesheva   Julia Dujmovits 
Final parallel slalom standings: (1) Tudegesheva 7690 points (2) Mägert-Kohli 5770 (3) Marion Kreiner  4540
Tudegesheva becomes the first Russian to win a World Cup title.
Final speed overall standings: (1) Tudegesheva 6000 points (2) Dominique Maltais  4800 (3) Mägert-Kohli 4050

Volleyball
Men's CEV Champions League Final Four in Bolzano, Italy:
3rd place: Jastrzębski Węgiel  1–3   Dynamo Moscow
Final:  Trentino BetClic  3–1   Zenit Kazan
Trentino win their third successive title.

March 26, 2011 (Saturday)

Auto racing
Nationwide Series:
Royal Purple 300 in Fontana, California: (1)  Kyle Busch (Toyota; Joe Gibbs Racing) (2)  Carl Edwards (Ford; Roush Fenway Racing) (3)  Kevin Harvick (Chevrolet; Kevin Harvick Incorporated)
Drivers' championship standings (after 5 of 34 races): (1)  Ricky Stenhouse Jr. (Ford; Roush Fenway Racing) 181 points (2)  Jason Leffler (Chevrolet; Turner Motorsports) 175 (3)  Justin Allgaier (Chevrolet; Turner Motorsports) 156

Basketball
NCAA Division I Men's Tournament (seeds in parentheses):
Southeast Regional Final in New Orleans, Louisiana: (8) Butler 74, (2) Florida 71 (OT)
The Bulldogs advance to the Final Four for the second successive season.
West Regional Final in Anaheim, California: (3) Connecticut 65, (5) Arizona 63
The Huskies advance to the Final Four for the second time in three seasons.
Women's Division I Tournament (seeds in parentheses):
Dayton Regional Semifinals in Dayton, Ohio:
(1) Tennessee 85, (4) Ohio State 75
(2) Notre Dame 78, (6) Oklahoma 53
Spokane Regional Semifinals in Spokane, Washington:
(11) Gonzaga 76, (7) Louisville 69
The Zags become the lowest seed ever to make a regional final in the women's tournament.
(1) Stanford 72, (5) North Carolina 65
NCAA Division II Men's Tournament – Final in Springfield, Massachusetts:
Bellarmine 71, BYU–Hawaii 68

Cricket
World Cup:
Quarter-final:  229/6 (50 overs);  231/0 (39.3 overs; Tillakaratne Dilshan 108*, Upul Tharanga 102*) in Colombo, Sri Lanka. Sri Lanka win by 10 wickets.

Curling
World Women's Championship in Esbjerg, Denmark:
3 vs. 4 playoff: Denmark  7–10 
Semifinal: China  5–8

Cycling
UCI Track World Championships in Apeldoorn, Netherlands:
Women's sprint:  Anna Meares   Simona Krupeckaitė   Victoria Pendleton 
Men's keirin:  Shane Perkins   Chris Hoy   Teun Mulder 
Men's omnium:  Michael Freiberg   Shane Archbold   Gijs Van Hoecke 
Women's scratch:  Marianne Vos   Katherine Bates   Danielle King 
UCI World Tour:
Volta a Catalunya, Stage 6:  José Joaquín Rojas  4h 22' 19"  Manuel Antonio Cardoso  s.t.  Samuel Dumoulin  s.t.
General classification (after stage 6): (1) Alberto Contador  26h 50' 47" (2) Levi Leipheimer  + 23" (3) Michele Scarponi  + 23"

Equestrianism
FEI Dressage World Cup:
Western European League, 10th competition in 's-Hertogenbosch (CDI-W):  Adelinde Cornelissen  on Parzival  Isabell Werth  on Warum Nicht FRH  Hans Peter Minderhoud  on Nadine
Final standings: (1) Cornelissen 80 points (2) Ulla Salzgeber  & Werth 77
Cornelissen, Salzgeber and Werth along with six other riders qualify for the World Cup Final.
Central European League Final in Warsaw (CDI-W):  Katarzyna Milczarek  on Ekwador  Robert Acs  on Weinzauber Sergey Puzko  on Kompliment
Milczarek and Acs qualify for the World Cup Final.

Football (soccer)
UEFA Euro 2012 qualifying, matchday 5:
Group A:  4–0 
Standings: Germany 15 points (5 matches),  7 (5),  7 (4),  6 (4),  3 (3), Kazakhstan 0 (5).
Group B:
 0–0 
 0–1 
 2–1 
Standings (after 5 matches): Slovakia, Russia, Republic of Ireland 10 points, Armenia 8, Macedonia 4, Andorra 0.
Group D:
 2–1 
 1–0 
Standings:  12 points (5 matches), Belarus, Albania 8 (5), Bosnia and Herzegovina 7 (4), Romania 2 (4),  1 (5).
Group F:
 1–0 
 2–1 
 0–1 
Standings (after 5 matches): Greece 11 points, Croatia 10, Georgia 9, Israel 7, Latvia 4, Malta 0.
Group G:
 0–2 
 0–0 
Standings (after 4 matches): England,  10 points, Switzerland, Bulgaria 4, Wales 0.
Group H:
 0–0 
 1–1 
Standings (after 4 matches): Norway 10 points, Denmark 7, Cyprus 2, Iceland 1.
Africa Cup of Nations qualification, matchday 3 (team in bold qualifies for the 2012 Africa Cup of Nations):
Group A:
 4–2 
 1–0 
Standings (after 3 matches): Cape Verde Islands 7 points, Mali 6, Zimbabwe 2, Liberia 1.
Group D:  2–1 
Standings:  4 points (2 matches), Tanzania, Central African Republic 4 (3),  1 (2).
Group E:  1–0 
Standings: Senegal 9 points (3 matches), Cameroon 4 (3),  1 (2),  0 (2).
Group F:  4–0 
Standings (after 2 matches): Burkina Faso 6 points,  3, Namibia 0.
Group G:  1–0 
Standings: South Africa 7 points (3 matches),  3 (2),  2 (2), Egypt 1 (3).
Group H:  3–1 
Standings:  6 points (2 matches),  4 (2), Rwanda 3 (3), Burundi 1 (3).
Group J:
 2–1 
 0–1 
Standings (after 3 matches): Uganda 7 points, Kenya 4, Angola, Guinea-Bissau 3.
Group K:
 1–0 
 0–1 
Standings: Botswana 16 points (6 matches), Malawi 9 (5),  7 (5), Togo 3 (6), Chad 2 (6).
Friendly internationals: (top 10 in FIFA World Rankings)
 1–1 (4) 
(9)  1–1

Horse racing
Dubai World Cup in Dubai, United Arab Emirates:  Victoire Pisa (trainer: Katsuhiko Sumii; jockey: Mirco Demuro)  Transcend (trainer: Takayuki Yasuda; jockey: Shinji Fujita)  Monterosso (trainer: Mahmood Al Zarooni; jockey: Mickael Barzalona)
Victoire Pisa becomes the first horse from Japan to win the race.

Mixed martial arts
UFC Fight Night: Seattle in Seattle, Washington, United States:
Light heavyweight bout: Phil Davis  def. Antônio Rogério Nogueira  via unanimous decision (30–27, 30–27, 30–27)
Welterweight bout: Anthony Johnson  def. Dan Hardy  via unanimous decision (30–27, 30–27, 30–27)
Welterweight bout: Amir Sadollah  def. DaMarques Johnson  via submission (strikes)
Featherweight bout: Jung Chan-Sung  def. Leonard Garcia  via submission (twister)

Rowing
157th University Boat Race on the River Thames, London: ( unless stated)
Oxford University Boat Club (Moritz Hafner , Ben Myers, Alec Dent, Ben Ellison, Karl Hudspith, Constantine Louloudis, George Whittaker, Simon Hislop, Sam Winter-Levy) beat Cambridge University Boat Club (Mike Thorp, Joel Jennings, Dan Rix-Standing, Hardy Cubasch , George Nash, Geoff Roth , Derek Rasmussen , David Nelson , Liz Box) by 4 lengths.
Oxford cut Cambridge's overall lead to 80–76, with one dead heat.

Snowboarding
World Cup in Arosa, Switzerland:
Men's halfpipe:  Yuri Podladchikov  27.6 points  Jan Scherrer  27.2  Patrick Burgener  26.9
Final halfpipe standings: (1) Nathan Johnstone  3510 points (2) Ryō Aono  2800 (3) Arthur Longo  1600
Johnstone wins his first halfpipe World Cup.
Final freestyle overall standings: (1) Johnstone 3510 points (2) Clemens Schattschneider  2960 (3) Aono 2800
Women's halfpipe:  Queralt Castellet  27.0 points  Holly Crawford  25.5  Cai Xuetong  24.7
Castellet takes Spain's first victory in any World Cup event.
Final halfpipe standings: (1) Cai 4400 points (2) Crawford 3900 (3) Sun Zhifeng  2300
Cai wins her second consecutive halfpipe World Cup.
Final freestyle overall standings: (1) Cai 4400 points (2) Crawford 3900 (3) Sun 2300

Volleyball
Men's CEV Champions League Final Four in Bolzano, Italy:
Semifinals:
Jastrzębski Węgiel  0–3  Trentino BetClic
Dynamo Moscow  0–3  Zenit Kazan

March 25, 2011 (Friday)

Basketball
NCAA Division I Men's Tournament (seeds in parentheses):
East Regional Semifinals in Newark, New Jersey:
(2) North Carolina 81, (11) Marquette 63
(4) Kentucky 62, (1) Ohio State 60
Southwest Regional Semifinals in San Antonio, Texas:
(1) Kansas 77, (12) Richmond 57
(11) VCU 72, (10) Florida State 71 (OT)
NCAA Division II Women's Tournament – Final in St. Joseph, Missouri:
Clayton State 69, Michigan Tech 50

Cricket
World Cup:
Quarter-final:  221/8 (50 overs);  172 (43.2 overs) in Dhaka, Bangladesh. New Zealand win by 49 runs.

Curling
World Women's Championship in Esbjerg, Denmark:
Tiebreaker: Canada  8–6 
1 vs. 2 playoff: Sweden  7–6 
Sweden advance to the final.

Cycling
UCI Track World Championships in Apeldoorn, Netherlands:
Men's points race:    33 points  Cameron Meyer  25  Morgan Kneisky  23
Women's individual pursuit:  Sarah Hammer  3:32.933  Alison Shanks  3:33.229  Vilija Sereikaitė  3:37.643
Men's sprint:  Grégory Baugé   Jason Kenny   Chris Hoy 
UCI World Tour:
Volta a Catalunya, Stage 5:  Samuel Dumoulin  4h 49' 31"  José Joaquín Rojas  s.t.  Rubén Pérez   s.t.
General classification (after stage 5): (1) Alberto Contador  22h 28' 28" (2) Levi Leipheimer  + 23" (3) Michele Scarponi  + 23"

Football (soccer)
UEFA Euro 2012 qualifying, matchday 5:
Group A:  0–2 
Standings:  12 points (4 matches), Belgium 7 (5), Austria 7 (4),  6 (4),  3 (3),  0 (4).
Group C:
 2–1 
 0–1 
Standings: Italy 13 points (5 matches), Slovenia, Serbia 7 (5),  6 (4), Northern Ireland 5 (4),  1 (5).
Group D:  0–2 
Standings: France 12 points (5 matches),  8 (4),  5 (4),  4 (3),  2 (3), Luxembourg 1 (5).
Group E:  0–4 
Standings: Netherlands 15 points (5 matches), Hungary 9 (5),  6 (3),  6 (4),  3 (4),  0 (5).
Group I:  2–1 
David Villa scores both goals to become Spain's highest goalscorer, with a tally of 46, two ahead of Raúl.
Standings: Spain 12 points (4 matches), Czech Republic 6 (4),  4 (4),  4 (3),  0 (3).
Friendly international: (top 10 in FIFA World Rankings)
 2–0 (7) 
South American Under-17 Championship in Ecuador: (teams in bold advance to the final round)
Group B:
 3–1 
 1–5 
Final standings: Brazil, Paraguay 9 points, Colombia 7,  4, Venezuela 0.

Snowboarding
World Cup in Arosa, Switzerland:
Men's snowboard cross:  Alex Pullin   Luca Matteotti   Nick Baumgartner 
Final snowboard cross standings: (1) Pullin 3270 points (2) Pierre Vaultier  3210 (3) Jonathan Cheever  2690
Pullin wins his first World Cup title.
Overall standings: (1) Benjamin Karl  4950 points (2) Andreas Prommegger  4210 (3) Roland Fischnaller  4110
Women's snowboard cross:  Aleksandra Zhekova   Lindsey Jacobellis   Nelly Moenne Loccoz 
Final snowboard cross standings: (1) Dominique Maltais  4800 points (2) Zhekova 4040 (3) Jacobellis 3610
Maltais wins her second snowboard cross World Cup title.
Overall standings: (1) Yekaterina Tudegesheva  6000 points (2) Maltais 4800 (3) Fränzi Mägert-Kohli  4050

March 24, 2011 (Thursday)

Basketball
EuroCup Women Final, second leg (first leg score in parentheses):
ASPTT Arras  53–61 (61–61)  Elitzur Ramla. Elitzur Ramla win 122–114 on aggregate.
Elitzur Ramla become the first Israeli women's team to win a European title in any sport.
Euroleague Quarterfinals, game 2 (best-of-5 series):
Caja Laboral  81–83  Maccabi Tel Aviv. Series tied 1–1.
Regal FC Barcelona  71–75  Panathinaikos BC. Series tied 1–1.
Real Madrid  75–81  Power Electronics Valencia. Series tied 1–1.
Olympiacos Piraeus  65–82  Montepaschi Siena. Series tied 1–1.
NCAA Division I Men's Tournament (seeds in parentheses):
West Regional Semifinals in Anaheim, California:
(3) Connecticut 74, (2) San Diego State 67
(5) Arizona 93, (1) Duke 77
Southeast Regional Semifinals in New Orleans, Louisiana:
(2) Florida 83, (3) BYU 74 (OT)
(8) Butler 61, (4) Wisconsin 54

Cricket
World Cup:
Quarter-final:  260/5 (50 overs, Ricky Ponting 104);  261/5 (47.4 overs) in Ahmedabad, India. India win by 5 wickets.

Curling
World Women's Championship in Esbjerg, Denmark (teams in bold advance to the playoffs, teams in italics advance to a tiebreaker):
Draw 15:
Czech Republic  4–6 
South Korea  2–9 
Switzerland  9–3 
China  8–5 
Draw 16:
Denmark  5–7 
Scotland  6–3 
Canada  8–6 
Czech Republic  6–7 
Draw 17:
Switzerland  7–4 
Russia  3–10 
Sweden  3–8 
Germany  6–5 
Final standings: Sweden 9–2; China 8–3; Denmark, Canada, Switzerland 7–4; Russia, United States 6–5; Germany 5–6; Scotland 4–7; Norway 3–8; South Korea, Czech Republic 2–9.

Cycling
UCI Track World Championships in Apeldoorn, Netherlands:
Women's team pursuit:   (Laura Trott, Wendy Houvenaghel, Danielle King) 3:23.419   (Sarah Hammer, Dotsie Bausch, Jennie Reed) 3:25.308   (Kaytee Boyd, Jaime Nielsen, Alison Shanks) 3:24.065
Women's team sprint:   (Anna Meares, Kaarle McCulloch) 33.237   (Jessica Varnish, Victoria Pendleton) 33.525   (Gong Jinjie, Guo Shuang) 33.586
Men's individual pursuit:  Jack Bobridge  4:21.141  Jesse Sergent  4:23.865  Michael Hepburn  4:22.553
UCI World Tour:
Volta a Catalunya, Stage 4:  Manuel Antonio Cardoso  4h 33' 02"  Giacomo Nizzolo  s.t.  José Joaquín Rojas  s.t.
General classification (after stage 4): (1) Alberto Contador   17h 38' 57" (2) Levi Leipheimer  + 23" (3) Michele Scarponi  + 23"

Darts
Premier League, week 7 in Brighton, England:
Mark Webster  2–8 Simon Whitlock 
Adrian Lewis  7–7 Terry Jenkins 
Raymond van Barneveld  8–5 Gary Anderson 
Phil Taylor  8–1 James Wade 
Standings (after 7 matches): Taylor 12 points, van Barneveld 10, Anderson 8, Lewis 7, Whitlock 6, Jenkins 5, Webster, Wade 4.

Football (soccer)
South American Under-17 Championship in Ecuador (teams in bold advance to the final group):
Group A:
 0–3 
 2–0 
Final standings: Argentina 9 points, Ecuador 7, Uruguay 6, Peru 4,  3.
Copa Libertadores Second Stage (team in bold advances to the knockout stage):
Group 2: Oriente Petrolero  2–0  León de Huánuco
Standings:  Junior 12 points (4 matches),  Grêmio 7 (4), León de Huánuco 4 (5), Oriente Petrolero 3 (5).
Group 4: Vélez Sársfield  2–1  Unión Española
Standings (after 4 matches):  Universidad Católica 7 points, Vélez Sársfield,  Caracas 6, Unión Española 4.

Snooker
Championship League:
Final: Matthew Stevens  3–1 Shaun Murphy 
Stevens wins his seventh professional title and qualifies for the Premier League.

Snowboarding
World Cup in Arosa, Switzerland:
Men's snowboard cross:  Seth Wescott   Pierre Vaultier   Paul-Henri de Le Rue 
Snowboard cross standings (after 6 of 7 races): (1) Vaultier 2890 points (2) Jonathan Cheever  2690 (3) Alex Pullin  2288
Overall standings: (1) Benjamin Karl  4950 points (2) Andreas Prommegger  4210 (3) Roland Fischnaller  4110
Women's snowboard cross:  Aleksandra Zhekova   Callan Chythlook-Sifsof   Zoe Gillings 
Snowboard cross standings (after 6 of 7 races): (1) Dominique Maltais  4800 points (2) Zhekova 3200 (3) Lindsey Jacobellis  2810
Overall standings: (1) Yekaterina Tudegesheva  6000 points (2) Maltais 4800 (3) Fränzi Mägert-Kohli  4050

March 23, 2011 (Wednesday)

Cricket
World Cup:
Quarter-final:  112 (43.3 overs);  113/0 (20.5 overs) in Dhaka, Bangladesh. Pakistan win by 10 wickets.

Curling
World Women's Championship in Esbjerg, Denmark: (teams in bold advance to the playoffs)
Draw 12:
Russia  5–3 
Sweden  9–8 
Denmark  7–4 
Norway  5–6 
Draw 13:
South Korea  9–3 
China  14–5 
Russia  12–3 
Switzerland  4–7 
Draw 14:
Sweden  5–4 
Germany  7–3 
China  6–4 
Denmark  12–5 
Standings (after Draw 14): Sweden 8–1; Russia, China, Denmark 6–3; Canada, Switzerland 5–4; United States, Germany 4–5; Norway, Scotland 3–6; Czech Republic, South Korea 2–7.

Cycling
UCI Track World Championships in Apeldoorn, Netherlands:
Women's 500 m time trial:  Olga Panarina  33.896  Sandie Clair  33.919  Miriam Welte  34.496
Men's team pursuit:   (Jack Bobridge, Rohan Dennis, Michael Hepburn, Luke Durbridge) 3:57.832   (Alexei Markov, Evgeny Kovalev, Ivan Kovalev, Alexander Serov) 4:02.229   (Steven Burke, Peter Kennaugh, Andy Tennant, Sam Harrison) 4:02.781
Women's points race:  Tatsiana Sharakova  30 points  Jarmila Machačová  20  Giorgia Bronzini  14
Men's scratch:  Kwok Ho Ting   Elia Viviani   Morgan Kneisky 
Men's team sprint:   (Grégory Baugé, Michaël D'Almeida, Kévin Sireau) 43.867   (René Enders, Maximilian Levy, Stefan Nimke) 44.483   (Matthew Crampton, Chris Hoy, Jason Kenny) 44.235
UCI World Tour:
Volta a Catalunya, Stage 3:  Alberto Contador  4h 45' 31"  Michele Scarponi  + 23"  Levi Leipheimer  + 23"
General classification (after stage 3): (1) Contador  13h 05' 55" (2) Leipheimer + 23" (3) Scarponi + 23"

Football (soccer)
Copa Libertadores Second Stage:
Group 3: Fluminense  3–2  América
Standings (after 4 matches):  Argentinos Juniors 7 points, América 6, Fluminense 5,  Nacional 4.
Group 8: Godoy Cruz  1–1  Independiente
Standings (after 4 matches): Godoy Cruz 7 points,  LDU Quito,  Peñarol 6, Independiente 4.
UEFA Women's Champions League Quarter-finals, second leg (first leg scores in parentheses):
Duisburg  2–1 (3–1)  Everton. Duisburg win 5–2 on aggregate.
Lyon  1–0 (0–0)  Zvezda 2005 Perm. Lyon win 1–0 on aggregate.
Linköpings  2–2 (1–1)  Arsenal. 3–3 on aggregate, Arsenal win on away goals.
Turbine Potsdam  6–2 (3–0)  Juvisy. Turbine Potsdam win 9–2 on aggregate.

March 22, 2011 (Tuesday)

Basketball
Euroleague Quarterfinals, game 1:
Caja Laboral  76–70  Maccabi Tel Aviv. Caja Laboral lead series 1–0.
Regal FC Barcelona  83–82  Panathinaikos BC. Barcelona lead series 1–0.
Real Madrid  71–65  Power Electronics Valencia. Real Madrid lead series 1–0.
Olympiacos Piraeus  89–41  Montepaschi Siena. Olympiacos lead series 1–0.
Olympiacos lead 47–9 at half time en route to the most lopsided win in Euroleague knockout stage history.
Women's Division I Tournament (seeds in parentheses):
Dayton Regional, second round:
In Charlottesville, Virginia: (6) Oklahoma 88, (3) Miami (FL) 83
Philadelphia Regional, second round:
In Storrs, Connecticut: (1) Connecticut 64, (9) Purdue 40
In College Park, Maryland: (5) Georgetown 79, (4) Maryland 57
Spokane Regional, second round:
In Cincinnati, Ohio: (7) Louisville 85, (2) Xavier 75
Dallas Regional, second round:
In Auburn, Alabama: (6) Georgia 61, (3) Florida State 59
In Bossier City, Louisiana: (2) Texas A&M 70, (7) Rutgers 48
In Wichita, Kansas: (5) Green Bay 65, (4) Michigan State 56
In Waco, Texas: (1) Baylor 82, (9) West Virginia 68

Curling
World Women's Championship in Esbjerg, Denmark:
Draw 9:
Canada  7–4 
Norway  3–7 
Scotland  2–8 
Sweden  8–3 
Draw 10:
Norway  3–8 
United States  8–6 
Germany  5–7 
Russia  7–9 
Draw 11:
China  6–7 
Scotland  6–8 
United States  6–9 
South Korea  11–2 
Standings (after Draw 11): Sweden 6–1; Switzerland 5–2; Canada, China, Denmark, Russia 4–3; Germany, Norway, Scotland, United States 3–4; Czech Republic 2–5; South Korea 1–6.

Cycling
UCI World Tour:
Volta a Catalunya, Stage 2:  Alessandro Petacchi  4h 11' 08"  José Joaquín Rojas  s.t.  Manuel Antonio Cardoso  s.t.
General classification (after stage 2): (1) Gatis Smukulis  8h 19' 56" (2) Petacchi + 28" (3) Rojas + 28"

Football (soccer)
South American Under-17 Championship in Ecuador (teams in bold advance to the final group):
Group A:  3–0 
Standings:  7 points (3 matches), Argentina,  6 (3), Bolivia 3 (4),  1 (3).
Group B:
 3–0 
 1–0 
Standings: Colombia 7 points (3 matches), Paraguay,  6 (3), Chile 4 (4), Venezuela 0 (3).
Copa Libertadores Second Stage (team in bold advances to the knockout stage):
Group 1:
Libertad  2–2  Once Caldas
San Luis  3–1  Universidad San Martín
Standings (after 5 matches): Libertad 11 points, Universidad San Martín 6, San Luis 5, Once Caldas 4.
Group 4: Caracas  0–2  Universidad Católica
Standings: Universidad Católica 7 points (4 matches), Caracas 6 (4),  Unión Española 4 (3),  Vélez Sársfield 3 (3).

Snooker
Championship League Group 7:
Final: Liang Wenbo  0–3 Matthew Stevens 
Stevens advances to the winners group.

March 21, 2011 (Monday)

Basketball
Women's Division I Tournament (seeds in parentheses):
Dayton Regional, second round:
In Knoxville, Tennessee: (1) Tennessee 79, (8) Marquette 70
In Columbus, Ohio: (4) Ohio State 67, (5) Georgia Tech 60
In Salt Lake City, Utah: (2) Notre Dame 77, (10) Temple 64
Philadelphia Regional, second round:
In University Park, Pennsylvania: (3) DePaul 75, (6) Penn State 73
In Durham, North Carolina: (2) Duke 71, (10) Marist 66
Spokane Regional, second round:
In Spokane, Washington: (11) Gonzaga 89, (3) UCLA 75
Gonzaga point guard Courtney Vandersloot becomes the first Division I player of either sex to record 2,000 points and 1,000 assists in a career.
In Stanford, California: (1) Stanford 75, (9) St. John's 49
In Albuquerque, New Mexico: (5) North Carolina 86, (4) Kentucky 74

Curling
World Women's Championship in Esbjerg, Denmark:
Draw 6:
United States  4–11 
Canada  3–7 
South Korea  6–8 
Czech Republic  3–9 
Draw 7:
Germany  3–9 
China  5–7 
Czech Republic  2–9 
Canada  7–5 
Draw 8:
Sweden  10–7 
Switzerland  3–6 
Norway  9–8 
United States  9–4 
Standings (after Draw 8): Sweden 4–1; China, Denmark, Norway, Russia, Scotland, Switzerland 3–2; Canada, Czech Republic, Germany, United States 2–3; South Korea 0–5.

Cycling
UCI World Tour:
Volta a Catalunya, Stage 1 & General classification:  Gatis Smukulis   4h 08' 48"  Alessandro Petacchi  + 28"  José Joaquín Rojas  + 28"

Football (soccer)
South American Under-17 Championship in Ecuador (team in bold advances to the final group):
Group A:
 1–0 
 –  — suspended after 77 minutes due to a power outage.
Standings: Ecuador 7 points (3 matches), Uruguay 6 (3), Argentina 3 (2), Bolivia 3 (3),  1 (3).
CAF Confederation Cup First round, first leg: Wits  1–1  AS Adema

Golf
European Tour:
Sicilian Open in Ragusa, Italy:
Winner: Raphaël Jacquelin  272 (−12)
Jacquelin wins his third European Tour title, and first since 2007.

March 20, 2011 (Sunday)

Alpine skiing
World Cup in Lenzerheide, Switzerland:
Team event:   (Viktoria Rebensburg, Maria Riesch, Susanne Riesch, Fritz Dopfer, Stephan Keppler, Felix Neureuther)   (Federica Brignone, Giulia Gianesini, Denise Karbon, Cristian Deville, Manfred Mölgg, Giuliano Razzoli)   (Anna Fenninger, Elisabeth Görgl, Michaela Kirchgasser, Romed Baumann, Hannes Reichelt, Philipp Schörghofer)

Athletics
IAAF World Cross Country Championships in Punta Umbría, Spain:
Women's junior race:  Faith Chepngetich Kipyegon  18:53  Genet Yalew  18:54  Azemra Gebru  18:54
Men's junior race:  Geoffrey Kipsang Kamworor  22:21  Thomas Ayeko  22:27  Patrick Mutunga Mwikya  22:32
Women's senior race:  Vivian Cheruiyot  24:58  Linet Masai  25:07  Shalane Flanagan  25:10
Men's senior race:  Imane Merga  33:50  Paul Kipngetich Tanui  33:52  Vincent Chepkok  33:53
European Cup Winter Throwing in Sofia, Bulgaria, day 2:
Discus women:  Olesya Korotkova  60.20 m  Nicoleta Grasu  59.44 m  Vera Ganeyeva  57.45 m
Hammer women:  Tatyana Lysenko  73.70 m  Betty Heidler  72.71 m  Zalina Marghieva  71.96 m
Javelin men:  Zigismunds Sirmais  84.47 m (WJR)  Oleksandr Pyatnytsya  81.96 m  Valeriy Iordan  79.49 m
Shot put men:  Hamza Alić  20.21 m  Marco Fortes  20.18 m  Soslan Tsirikov  19.45 m

Auto racing
Sprint Cup Series:
Jeff Byrd 500 in Bristol, Tennessee: (1)  Kyle Busch (Toyota; Joe Gibbs Racing) (2)  Carl Edwards (Ford; Roush Fenway Racing) (3)  Jimmie Johnson (Chevrolet; Hendrick Motorsports)
Drivers' championship standings (after 4 of 36 races): (1)  Kurt Busch (Dodge; Penske Racing) 150 points (2) Edwards 149 (3)  Tony Stewart (Chevrolet; Stewart Haas Racing) &  Ryan Newman (Chevrolet; Stewart Haas Racing) 138
V8 Supercars:
Clipsal 500 in Adelaide, South Australia:
Race 4: (1) Jamie Whincup  (Triple Eight Race Engineering, Holden VE Commodore) (2) Rick Kelly  (Kelly Racing; Holden VE Commodore) (3) Mark Winterbottom  (Ford Performance Racing, Ford FG Falcon)
Drivers' championship standings (after 4 of 27 races): (1) Whincup 567 points (2) Winterbottom 423 (3) Garth Tander  (Holden Racing Team, Holden VE Commodore) 363
World Touring Car Championship:
Race of Brazil in Curitiba:
Race 1: (1) Rob Huff  (Chevrolet; Chevrolet Cruze) (2) Yvan Muller  (Chevrolet; Chevrolet Cruze) (3) Cacá Bueno  (Chevrolet; Chevrolet Cruze)
Race 2: (1) Alain Menu  (Chevrolet; Chevrolet Cruze) (2) Tom Coronel  (ROAL Motorsport; BMW 320 TC) (3) Muller
Drivers' championship standings (after 2 of 22 races): (1) Huff 37 points (2) Menu & Muller 33

Basketball
NCAA Division I Men's Tournament (seeds in parentheses):
East Regional, third round:
In Charlotte, North Carolina: (2) North Carolina 86, (7) Washington 83
In Cleveland, Ohio:
(1) Ohio State 98, (8) George Mason 66
(11) Marquette 66, (3) Syracuse 62
Southwest Regional, third round:
In Chicago, Illinois:
(11) VCU 94, (3) Purdue 76
(10) Florida State 71, (2) Notre Dame 57
In Tulsa, Oklahoma: (1) Kansas 73, (9) Illinois 59
West Regional, third round:
In Charlotte, North Carolina: (1) Duke 73, (8) Michigan 71
In Tulsa, Oklahoma: (5) Arizona 70, (4) Texas 69
Women's Division I Tournament (seeds in parentheses):
Philadelphia Regional, first round:
In Storrs, Connecticut:
(1) Connecticut 75, (16) Hartford 39
(9) Purdue 53, (8) Kansas State 45
In College Park, Maryland:
(4) Maryland 70, (13) St. Francis (PA) 48
(5) Georgetown 65, (12) Princeton 49
Spokane Regional, first round:
In Cincinnati, Ohio:
(7) Louisville 81, (10) Vanderbilt 62
(2) Xavier 72, (15) South Dakota State 56
Dayton Regional, first round:
In Charlottesville, Virginia:
(3) Miami (FL) 80, (14) Gardner–Webb 62
(6) Oklahoma 86, (11) James Madison 72
Dallas Regional, first round:
In Bossier City, Louisiana:
(2) Texas A&M 87, (15) McNeese State 47
(7) Rutgers 76, (10) Louisiana Tech 51
In Waco, Texas:
(9) West Virginia 79, (8) Houston 73
(1) Baylor 66, (16) Prairie View A&M 30
In Auburn, Alabama:
(3) Florida State 76, (14) Samford 46
(6) Georgia 56, (11) Middle Tennessee 41
In Wichita, Kansas:
(5) Green Bay 59, (12) Arkansas–Little Rock 55
(4) Michigan State 69, (13) Northern Iowa 66

Biathlon
World Cup 9 in Holmenkollen, Norway:
Women's 12.5 km mass start:  Darya Domracheva  36:13.0 (1+0+0+2)  Anna Bogaliy-Titovets  36:29.0 (0+0+0+1)  Olga Zaitseva  36:38.0 (0+0+1+0)
Final mass start standings: (1) Domracheva 236 points (2) Magdalena Neuner  228 (3) Tora Berger  206
Domracheva wins her first World Cup discipline title.
Final overall standings: (1) Kaisa Mäkäräinen  1005 points (2) Andrea Henkel  972 (3) Helena Ekholm  971
Mäkäräinen becomes the first Finnish woman to win the overall World Cup.
Men's 15 km mass start:  Emil Hegle Svendsen  39:07.6 (0+1+1+0)  Evgeny Ustyugov  39:08.0 (0+0+0+1)  Ole Einar Bjørndalen  39:17.6 (0+1+0+0)
Final mass start standings: (1) Svendsen 244 points (2) Martin Fourcade  230 (3) Tarjei Bø  211
Svendsen wins his first World Cup mass start title.
Final overall standings: (1) Bø 1110 points (2) Svendsen 1105 (3) Fourcade 990
In his first full season, Bø becomes the fifth Norwegian man to win the overall World Cup.

Cricket
World Cup (teams in bold advance to the quarter-finals):
Group A:  308/6 (50 overs);  147 (36 overs) in Kolkata, India. Zimbabwe win by 161 runs.
Final standings:  10 points,  9,  8, Zimbabwe 4,  2, Kenya 0.
Group B:  268 (49.1 overs; Yuvraj Singh 113, Ravi Rampaul 5/51);  188 (43 overs) in Chennai, India. India win by 80 runs.
Final standings:  10 points, India 9,  7, West Indies,  6,  4,  0.

Cross-country skiing
World Cup Final:
Stage 4 in Falun, Sweden:
Men's 15 km freestyle handicap start:  Finn Hågen Krogh  37:06.3  Maurice Manificat  37:29.5  Lukáš Bauer  37:30.5
Final standings: (1) Petter Northug  1:46:32.0 (2) Krogh 1:48:17.1 (3) Dario Cologna  1:48:17.4
Final World Cup overall standings: (1) Cologna 1566 points (2) Northug 1236 (3) Daniel Rickardsson  981
Cologna wins his second overall title in three seasons.
Women's 10 km freestyle handicap start:  Arianna Follis  27:30.1  Astrid Uhrenholdt Jacobsen  27:37.7  Therese Johaug  27:54.2
Final standings: (1) Marit Bjørgen  1:08:48.7 (2) Justyna Kowalczyk  1:10:46.7 (3) Johaug 1:11:19.1
Final World Cup overall standings: (1) Kowalczyk 2073 points (2) Bjørgen 1578 (3) Follis 1310
Kowalczyk wins her third successive World Cup title.

Curling
World Women's Championship in Esbjerg, Denmark:
Draw 4:
Switzerland  9–3 
South Korea  3–10 
Canada  4–9 
Scotland  7–6 
Draw 5:
Scotland  3–5 
Czech Republic  7–5 
Germany  2–8 
Denmark  8–5 
Standings (after Draw 5): China, Czech Republic, Germany, Norway, Russia, Sweden, Switzerland 2–1; Canada, Denmark, Scotland, United States 1–2; South Korea 0–3.

Football (soccer)
CAF Champions League First round, first leg:
US Bitam  0–0  Enyimba
TP Mazembe  3–1  Simba
Dynamos  4–1  MC Alger
Club Africain  4–2  Zamalek
AS Vita Club  0–1  Cotonsport
Diaraf  3–0  Djoliba
Al-Hilal  3–0  Recreativo Caála
WAC Casablanca  2–0  Kano Pillars
CAF Confederation Cup First round, first leg:
Étoile du Sahel  3–0  Ashanti Gold
Wits  –  AS Adema — abandoned after 45 minutes due to a waterlogged pitch.
Kaduna United  2–0  Foullah Edifice
Sunshine Stars  2–0  Tiko United
JS Kabylie  1–0  ASC Tevragh-Zeïna
Haras El-Hodood  4–0  Dedebit
 Greek Superleague, matchday 27 (team in bold qualifies for the UEFA Champions League):
Olympiacos 6–0 AEK Athens
Panathinaikos 2–1 Kerkyra
Standings (after 27 matches): Olympiacos 67 points, Panathinaikos 57, AEK Athens 43.
Olympiacos win the title for a record-extending 38th time.
 Scottish League Cup Final in Glasgow:
Rangers 2–1 (a.e.t.) Celtic
Rangers win the Cup for a record-extending 27th time.

Freestyle skiing
World Cup in Myrkdalen-Voss, Norway:
Men's dual moguls:  Guilbaut Colas  35.00 points  Mikaël Kingsbury  0.00  Alexandre Bilodeau  21.00
Final moguls standings: (1) Colas 841 points (2) Bilodeau 739 (3) Kingsbury 725
Colas wins his first moguls World Cup.
Women's dual moguls:  Hannah Kearney  35.00 points  Jennifer Heil  0.00  Justine Dufour-Lapointe  30.00
Final moguls standings: (1) Kearney 1009 points (2) Heil 712 (3) Audrey Robichaud  466
Kearney wins her second moguls World Cup.
World Cup in La Plagne, France:
Men's halfpipe:  Kevin Rolland  46.6 points  David Wise  44.2  Justin Dorey  43.2
Final halfpipe standings: (1) Benoit Valentin  205 points (2) Xavier Bertoni  172 (3) Wise 140
Final overall standings: (1) Colas 76 points (2) Andreas Matt  75 points (3) Bilodeau 67
Colas wins his first overall World Cup.
Women's halfpipe:  Sarah Burke  46.4 points  Devin Logan  44.3  Virginie Faivre  42.7
Final halfpipe standings: (1) Burke 200 points (2) Rosalind Groenewoud  200 (3) Faivre 185
Final overall standings: (1) Kearney 92 points (2) Heil 65 (3) Cheng Shuang  63
Kearney wins her first overall World Cup.

Golf
PGA Tour:
Transitions Championship in Palm Harbor, Florida:
Winner: Gary Woodland  269 (−15)
Woodland wins his first PGA Tour title.
European Tour:
Sicilian Open in Ragusa, Italy:
Final round suspended due to weather and darkness; to be completed on March 21.
LPGA Tour:
RR Donnelley LPGA Founders Cup in Phoenix, Arizona:
Winner: Karrie Webb  204 (−12)
Webb wins her second title of the season, and her 38th LPGA Tour title.

Ice hockey
NCAA Division I Women's Final in Erie, Pennsylvania:
Wisconsin 4, Boston University 1

Motorcycle racing
Moto GP:
Qatar Grand Prix in Losail, Qatar:
MotoGP: (1) Casey Stoner  (Honda) (2) Jorge Lorenzo  (Yamaha) (3) Dani Pedrosa  (Honda)
Moto2: (1) Stefan Bradl  (Kalex) (2) Andrea Iannone  (Suter) (3) Thomas Lüthi  (Suter)
125cc: (1) Nicolás Terol  (Aprilia) (2) Sandro Cortese  (Aprilia) (3) Sergio Gadea  (Aprilia)

Rugby union
 LV= Cup Final in Northampton: Gloucester 34–7 Newcastle Falcons
Gloucester win the Cup for the first time in its current guise, and the fifth time outright.

Short track speed skating
World Team Championships in Warsaw, Poland:
Women's:   (Cho Ha-ri, Kim Dam-min, Park Seung-hi, Hwang Hyun-sun) 35 points   (Li Jianrou, Xiao Han, Fan Kexin, Liu Qiuhong, Zhang Hui) 34   (Alyson Dudek, Katherine Reutter, Jessica Smith, Lana Gehring) 29
South Korea win their second consecutive world title and twelfth overall.
Men's:   (Noh Jin-kyu, Lee Ho-suk, Kim Byeong-jun, Um Cheon-ho, Kim Cheol-min) 38 points   (Liu Xianwei, Liang Wenhao, Yang Jin, Song Weilong, Gong Qiuwen) 35   (Michael Gilday, François Hamelin, Olivier Jean, Charles Hamelin, Guillaume Blais Dufour) 28
South Korea win their third consecutive world title and eighth overall.

Ski jumping
World Cup in Planica, Slovenia:
HS 215 (ski flying):  Kamil Stoch  217.3 points  Robert Kranjec  215.0  Adam Małysz  203.6
Final ski flying standings: (1) Gregor Schlierenzauer  475 points (2) Martin Koch  387 (3) Thomas Morgenstern  378
Schlierenzauer wins the sky flying title for the second time.
Final overall standings: (1) Morgenstern 1757 points (2) Simon Ammann  1364 (3) Małysz 1153
Morgenstern wins his second overall World Cup.

Snooker
Players Tour Championship:
Finals in Dublin, Republic of Ireland:
Final: Shaun Murphy  4–0 Martin Gould 
Murphy wins his fourth ranking and eleventh professional title.

Tennis
ATP World Tour:
BNP Paribas Open in Indian Wells, United States:
Final: Novak Djokovic  def. Rafael Nadal  4–6, 6–3, 6–2
Djokovic wins the tournament for the second time, winning his third title of the season and the 21st of his career.
WTA Tour:
BNP Paribas Open in Indian Wells, United States:
Final: Caroline Wozniacki  def. Marion Bartoli  6–1, 2–6, 6–3
Wozniacki wins her second title of the season, and the 14th of her career.

Volleyball
Women's CEV Champions League Final Four in Istanbul, Turkey:
Third place game:  Fenerbahçe Acıbadem  3–1  Scavolini Pesaro
Final:  VakıfBank Güneş TTelekom  3–0   Rabita Baku
VakıfBank Güneş TTelekom become the first side from Turkey to win the tournament.

March 19, 2011 (Saturday)

Alpine skiing
Women's World Cup in Lenzerheide, Switzerland:
Giant slalom: Cancelled due to poor conditions.
Final giant slalom standings: (1) Viktoria Rebensburg  435 points (2) Tessa Worley  358 (3) Tanja Poutiainen  240
Rebensburg wins her first World Cup title.
Final overall standings: (1) Maria Riesch  1728 points (2) Lindsey Vonn  1725 (3) Tina Maze  1139
Riesch becomes the first German woman to win the overall title since Katja Seizinger in 1998.
Men's World Cup in Lenzerheide, Switzerland:
Slalom:  Giuliano Razzoli  1:25.72 (41.99 / 43.73)  Mario Matt  1:25.75 (41.27 / 44.48)  Felix Neureuther  1:25.97 (41.46 / 44.51)
Final slalom standings: (1) Ivica Kostelić  478 points (2) Jean-Baptiste Grange  442 (3) André Myhrer  423
Kostelić wins his first slalom title since 2002.
Final overall standings: (1) Kostelić 1356 points (2) Didier Cuche  956 (3) Carlo Janka  793
Kostelić becomes the first Croatian man to win the overall World Cup title, and the second Croatian ever, after sister Janica.

Athletics
European Cup Winter Throwing in Sofia, Bulgaria, day 1:
Discus throw men:  Ercüment Olgundeniz  63.31 m  Erik Cadée  62.15 m  Sergiu Ursu  62.00 m
Hammer throw men:  Krisztián Pars  79.84 m  Yury Shayunou  77.41 m  Oleksiy Sokyrskyy  76.84 m
Javelin throw women:  Hanna Hatsko  58.35 m  Esther Eisenlauer  56.99 m  Ásdís Hjálmsdóttir  56.44 m
Shot put women:  Alena Kopets  17.71 m  Jessica Cérival  17.52 m  Chiara Rosa  17.39 m

Auto racing
Intercontinental Le Mans Cup:	
12 Hours of Sebring in Sebring, Florida: (1)  #10 Team Oreca-Matmut (Nicolas Lapierre , Loïc Duval , Olivier Panis ) (2)  #01 Highcroft Racing (David Brabham , Marino Franchitti , Simon Pagenaud ) (3)  #8 Peugeot Sport Total (Pedro Lamy , Franck Montagny , Stéphane Sarrazin )
Nationwide Series:
Scotts EZ Seed 300 in Bristol, Tennessee: (1)  Kyle Busch (Toyota; Joe Gibbs Racing) (2)  Kasey Kahne (Chevrolet; Turner Motorsports) (3)  Dale Earnhardt Jr. (Chevrolet; JR Motorsports)
Drivers' championship standings (after 4 of 34 races): (1)  Jason Leffler (Chevrolet; Turner Motorsports) 142 points (2)  Ricky Stenhouse Jr. (Ford; Roush Fenway Racing) 140 (3)  Justin Allgaier (Chevrolet; Turner Motorsports) 124
V8 Supercars:
Clipsal 500 in Adelaide, South Australia:
Race 3: (1) Garth Tander  (Holden Racing Team, Holden VE Commodore) (2) Jamie Whincup  (Triple Eight Race Engineering, Holden VE Commodore) (3) Craig Lowndes  (Triple Eight Race Engineering, Holden VE Commodore)
Drivers' championship standings (after 3 of 27 races): (1) Whincup 417 points (2) Mark Winterbottom  (Ford Performance Racing, Ford FG Falcon) 294 (3) Shane van Gisbergen  (Stone Brothers Racing, Ford FG Falcon) 276

Basketball
NCAA Division I Men's Tournament (seeds in parentheses):
East Regional, third round:
In Tampa, Florida: (4) Kentucky 71, (5) West Virginia 63
Southeast Regional, third round:
In Tampa, Florida: (2) Florida 73, (7) UCLA 65
In Washington, D.C.: (8) Butler 71, (1) Pittsburgh 70
In Denver, Colorado: (3) BYU 89, (11) Gonzaga 67
In Tucson, Arizona: (4) Wisconsin 70, (5) Kansas State 65
Southwest Regional, third round:
In Denver, Colorado: (12) Richmond 65, (13) Morehead State 48
West Regional, third round:
In Tucson, Arizona: (2) San Diego State 71, (7) Temple 64 (2OT)
In Washington, D.C.: (3) Connecticut 69, (6) Cincinnati 58
Women's Division I Tournament (seeds in parentheses):
Dayton Regional, first round:
In Knoxville, Tennessee:
(1) Tennessee 99, (16) Stetson 34
(8) Marquette 68, (9) Texas 65
In Columbus, Ohio:
(5) Georgia Tech 69, (12) Bowling Green 58
(4) Ohio State 80, (13) UCF 69
In Salt Lake City, Utah:
(10) Temple 63, (7) Arizona State 45
(2) Notre Dame 67, (15) Utah 54
Philadelphia Regional, first round:
In University Park, Pennsylvania:
(6) Penn State 75, (11) Dayton 66
(3) DePaul 56, (14) Navy 43
In Durham, North Carolina:
(10) Marist 74, (7) Iowa State 64
(2) Duke 90, (15) Tennessee–Martin 45
Spokane Regional, first round:
In Spokane, Washington:
(11) Gonzaga 92, (6) Iowa 86
(3) UCLA 55, (14) Montana 47
In Albuquerque, New Mexico:
(5) North Carolina 82, (12) Fresno State 68
(4) Kentucky 66, (13) Hampton 62 (OT)
In Stanford, California:
(9) St. John's 55, (8) Texas Tech 50
(1) Stanford 86, (16) UC Davis 59

Biathlon
World Cup 9 in Holmenkollen, Norway:
Women's 10 km pursuit:  Anastasiya Kuzmina  33:42.5 (0+2+1+0)  Darya Domracheva  34:05.6 (2+0+1+2)  Andrea Henkel  34:10.1 (0+0+1+2)
Final pursuit standings: (1) Kaisa Mäkäräinen  343 points (2) Henkel 303 (3) Helena Ekholm  279
Mäkäräinen wins her first World Cup discipline title.
Overall standings (after 25 of 26 races): (1) Mäkäräinen 979 points (2) Tora Berger  938 (3) Ekholm 935
Men's 12.5 km pursuit:  Emil Hegle Svendsen  32:59.2 (0+2+1+0)  Tarjei Bø  32:59.8 (0+0+1+0)  Martin Fourcade  33:06.5 (1+0+0+0)
Final pursuit standings: (1) Bø 334 points (2) Fourcade 320 (3) Svendsen 304
Bø wins his first pursuit World Cup, and his second discipline title.
Overall standings (after 25 of 26 races): (1) Bø 1076 points (2) Svendsen 1045 (3) Fourcade 954

Cricket
World Cup (teams in bold advance to the quarter-finals):
Group A:  176 (46.4 overs);  178/6 (41 overs) in Colombo, Sri Lanka. Pakistan win by 4 wickets.
Australia lose a World Cup match for the first time since losing to Pakistan in 1999, ending a 34-match unbeaten run.
Standings: Pakistan 10 points (6 matches), Australia 9 (6),  8 (6),  2 (5),  2 (6),  0 (5).
Group B:  284/8 (50 overs);  78 (28 overs) in Dhaka, Bangladesh. South Africa win by 206 runs.
Standings: South Africa 10 points (6 matches),  7 (5),  7 (6),  6 (5), Bangladesh 6 (6),  4 (6),  0 (6).

Cross-country skiing
World Cup Final:
Stage 3 in Falun, Sweden:
Men's 20 km pursuit:  Petter Northug  57:32.2  Giorgio Di Centa  57:34.8  Daniel Rickardsson  57:42.4
World Cup final standings: (1) Northug 1:08:42.4 (2) Emil Jönsson  1:10:10.0 (3) Rickardsson 1:10:19.6
Final World Cup distance standings: (1) Dario Cologna  706 points (2) Rickardsson 568 (3) Lukáš Bauer  553
World Cup overall standings (after 30 of 31 races): (1) Cologna 1446 points (2) Northug 1036 (3) Rickardsson 901
Women's 10 km pursuit:  Marit Bjørgen  31:14.4  Justyna Kowalczyk  31:39.5  Therese Johaug  31:48.3
World Cup final standings: (1) Bjørgen 40:50.7 (2) Kowalczyk 42:04.6 (3) Johaug 43:24.9
Final World Cup distance standings: (1) Kowalczyk 1039 points (2) Bjørgen 775 (3) Johaug 671
World Cup overall standings (after 30 of 31 races): (1) Kowalczyk 1913 points (2) Bjørgen 1378 (3) Arianna Follis  1210

Curling
World Women's Championship in Esbjerg, Denmark:
Draw 2:
China  6–8 
United States  3–5 
Scotland  5–6 
Russia  9–5 
Draw 3:
South Korea  2–5 
Sweden  8–4 
Denmark  6–7 
Germany  10–7 
Standings (after Draw 3): Germany, Norway 2–0; Canada, Czech Republic 1–0; Russia, Sweden, Switzerland, United States 1–1; China, Scotland 0–1; Denmark, South Korea 0–2.

Cycling
UCI World Tour:
Milan – San Remo:  Matthew Goss  6h 51' 10"  Fabian Cancellara  s.t.  Philippe Gilbert  s.t.
World Tour standings (after 4 of 27 races): (1) Goss 203 points (2) Michele Scarponi  118 (3) Cadel Evans  & Tony Martin  108

Equestrianism
Show jumping:
Global Champions Tour:
1st competition in Doha (CSI 5*):  Alvaro de Miranda Neto  on Ashleigh Drossel Dan  Pius Schwizer  on Carlina  Meredith Michaels-Beerbaum  on Shutterfly

Football (soccer)
South American Under-17 Championship in Ecuador:
Group B:
 2–1 
 1–2 
Standings: Brazil 6 points (3 matches),  4 (2), Chile 4 (3), Paraguay 3 (2), Venezuela 0 (2).
CAF Champions League First round, first leg:
Ittihad  –  JC Abidjan — cancelled due to the 2011 Libyan civil war
ZESCO United  5–0  Young Buffaloes
Motor Action  0–0 (2–4 pen.)  ASEC Mimosas
Espérance ST  5–0  ASPAC
Stade Malien  2–1  Raja Casablanca
Al-Merreikh  2–0  Inter Luanda
ES Sétif  2–0  ASFA Yennenga
CAF Confederation Cup First round, first leg:
Victors  1–1  Motema Pembe
FUS de Rabat  2–0  Touré Kunda Footpro
1º de Agosto  2–0  AC Léopard
MAS Fez  0–0  Sahel SC
OFC Champions League Group stage, matchday 6 (teams in bold advance to the final):
Group A:
Koloale  1–0  Amicale
PRK Hekari United  1–1  Lautoka
Final standings: Amicale 10 points, Koloale 9, Lautoka 8, PRK Hekari United 6.
Group B:
Waitakere United  2–1  AS Magenta
Auckland City  5–0  AS Tefana
Final standings: Auckland City 14 points, Waitakere United 8, AS Magenta 7, AS Tefana 4.
 Swedish Super Cup in Malmö:
Malmö FF 1–2 Helsingborgs IF

Freestyle skiing
World Cup in Myrkdalen-Voss, Norway:
Men's ski cross:  Christopher Del Bosco   Conradign Netzer   Tomáš Kraus 
Final ski cross standings: (1) Andreas Matt  824 points (2) Del Bosco 615 (3) Jouni Pellinen  462
Overall standings: (1) Matt 75 points (2) Guilbaut Colas  74 (3) Alexandre Bilodeau  68
Women's ski cross:  Anna Holmlund   Kelsey Serwa   Katrin Müller 
Final ski cross standings: (1) Holmlund 672 points (2) Heidi Zacher  612 (3) Serwa 610
Overall standings: (1) Hannah Kearney  91 points (2) Jennifer Heil  & Cheng Shuang  63

Mixed martial arts
UFC 128 in Newark, New Jersey, United States:
Light heavyweight championship bout: Jon Jones  def. Maurício Rua (c)  via TKO (strikes)
Bantamweight bout: Urijah Faber  def. Eddie Wineland  via unanimous decision (29–28, 29–28, 29–28)
Middleweight bout: Nate Marquardt  def. Dan Miller  via unanimous decision (30–27, 30–27, 30–27)
Heavyweight bout: Brendan Schaub  def. Mirko Filipović  via TKO (punch)
Lightweight bout: Jim Miller  def. Kamal Shalorus  via TKO (punches)

Rugby union
Six Nations Championship, Week 5:
 21–8  in Edinburgh
 24–8  in Dublin
In Ireland's victory, Brian O'Driscoll takes sole possession of the all-time record for career tries in the Championship with 25, and Ronan O'Gara equals the record of countryman Mike Gibson for appearances in the Championship with 56.
 28–9  in Saint-Denis
Final standings: England 8 points, France, Ireland, Wales 6, Scotland, Italy 2.
England win the Championship for the first time since 2003, and for the 26th time outright.
European Nations Cup First Division, week 5:
 9–15  in Sochi
 64–8  in Bucharest
 46–24  in Lisbon
Standings: Georgia 22 points (5 matches), Portugal 14 (5), Romania 11 (4), Russia 11 (5), Spain 10 (5), Ukraine 0 (4).

Ski jumping
World Cup in Planica, Slovenia:
HS 215 Team (ski flying):   (Thomas Morgenstern, Andreas Kofler, Martin Koch, Gregor Schlierenzauer) 1669.9 points   (Anders Bardal, Johan Remen Evensen, Bjørn Einar Romøren, Tom Hilde) 1534.4   (Peter Prevc, Jernej Damjan, Jurij Tepeš, Robert Kranjec) 1488.6

Snowboarding
World Cup in Valmalenco, Italy:
Men's parallel giant slalom:  Sylvain Dufour   Andreas Prommegger   Roland Haldi 
Parallel slalom standings (after 9 of 10 races): (1) Benjamin Karl  5500 points (2) Prommegger 4740 (3) Roland Fischnaller  4620
Overall standings: (1) Karl 5500 points (2) Prommegger 4740 (3) Fischnaller 4620
Women's parallel giant slalom:  Yekaterina Tudegesheva   Isabella Laböck   Julia Dujmovits 
Parallel slalom standings (after 9 of 10 races): (1) Tudegesheva 6890 points (2) Fränzi Mägert-Kohli  4770 (3) Marion Kreiner  4090
Overall standings: (1) Tudegesheva 6890 points (2) Mägert-Kohli 4770 (3) Dominique Maltais  4300

Volleyball
Women's CEV Champions League Final Four in Istanbul, Turkey:
Rabita Baku  3–1  Scavolini Pesaro
Fenerbahçe Acıbadem  2–3  VakıfBank Güneş TTelekom

March 18, 2011 (Friday)

Alpine skiing
Women's World Cup in Lenzerheide, Switzerland:
Slalom:  Tina Maze  1:29.33 (44.08 / 45.25)  Marlies Schild  1:29.38 (43.38 / 46.00)  Veronika Zuzulová  1:29.97 (44.92 / 45.05)
Final slalom standings: (1) Schild 680 points (2) Tanja Poutiainen  511 (3) Maria Riesch  470
Schild wins her third slalom World Cup title.
Overall standings (after 33 of 34 races): (1) Riesch 1728 points (2) Lindsey Vonn  1725 (3) Maze 1139
Men's World Cup in Lenzerheide, Switzerland:
Giant slalom: Cancelled due to poor conditions.
Final giant slalom standings: (1) Ted Ligety  383 points (2) Aksel Lund Svindal  306 (3) Cyprien Richard  303
Ligety wins his third giant slalom World Cup in four years.
Overall standings (after 35 of 36 races): (1) Ivica Kostelić  1356 points (2) Didier Cuche  956 (3) Carlo Janka  793

Basketball
NCAA Division I Men's Tournament (seeds in parentheses):
East Regional, second round:
In Cleveland:
(8) George Mason 61, (9) Villanova 57
(1) Ohio State 75, (16) Texas–San Antonio 46
(11) Marquette 66, (6) Xavier 55
(3) Syracuse 77, (14) Indiana State 60
In Charlotte, North Carolina:
(2) North Carolina 102, (15) Long Island 87
(7) Washington 68, (10) Georgia 65
Southwest Regional, second round:
In Chicago:
(2) Notre Dame 69, (15) Akron 56
(10) Florida State 57, (7) Texas A&M 50
(3) Purdue 65, (14) St. Peter's 43
(11) VCU 74, (6) Georgetown 56
In Tulsa, Oklahoma:
(1) Kansas 72, (16) Boston University 53
(9) Illinois 73, (8) UNLV 62
West Regional, second round:
In Tulsa, Oklahoma:
(4) Texas 85, (13) Oakland 81
(5) Arizona 77, (12) Memphis 75
In Charlotte, North Carolina:
(8) Michigan 75, (9) Tennessee 45
(1) Duke 87, (16) Hampton 45

Cricket
World Cup (teams in bold advance to the quarter-finals):
Group A:  265/9 (50 overs; Kumar Sangakkara 111);  153 (35 overs) in Mumbai, India. Sri Lanka win by 112 runs.
Standings: Sri Lanka 9 points (6 matches),  9 (5), New Zealand 8 (6),  8 (5),  2 (5),  2 (6),  0 (5).
Group B:  306 (50 overs; Ryan ten Doeschate 106);  307/4 (47.4 overs; Paul Stirling 101) in Kolkata, India. Ireland win by 6 wickets.
Standings:  8 points (5 matches),  7 (5),  7 (6),  6 (5), Ireland 4 (6), Netherlands 0 (6).

Cross-country skiing
World Cup Final:
Stage 2 in Falun, Sweden:
Men's 3.3 km classical individual:  Ilia Chernousov  10:51.8  Petter Northug  10:54.7  Maxim Vylegzhanin  10:56.0
World Cup final standings: (1) Northug 12:00.2 (2) Emil Jönsson  12:16.4 (3) Jesper Modin  12:32.5
World Cup distance standings (after 16 of 17 races): (1) Dario Cologna  666 points (2) Daniel Rickardsson  525 (3) Lukáš Bauer  519
World Cup overall standings (after 29 of 31 races): (1) Cologna 1406 points (2) Northug 986 (3) Rickardsson 858
Women's 2.5 km classical individual:  Marit Bjørgen  9:01.6  Justyna Kowalczyk  9:12.2  Therese Johaug  9:14.5
World Cup final standings: (1) Bjørgen 10:21.3 (2) Kowalczyk 10:55.1 (3) Petra Majdič  11:08.3
World Cup distance standings (after 16 of 17 races): (1) Kowalczyk 993 points (2) Bjørgen 725 (3) Johaug 628
World Cup overall standings (after 29 of 31 races): (1) Kowalczyk 1867 points (2) Bjørgen 1328 (3) Arianna Follis  1173

Curling
World Women's Championship in Esbjerg, Denmark:
Draw 1:
Denmark  3–8 
Norway  8–7

Football (soccer)
South American Under-17 Championship in Ecuador:
Group A:
 1–2 
 2–4 
Standings: Uruguay 6 points (2 matches),  4 (2), Argentina 3 (2), Bolivia 3 (3), Peru 1 (3).
CAF Champions League First round, first leg:
Al-Ahly  2–0  SuperSport United
CAF Confederation Cup First round, first leg:
Olympique Béja  2–0  Difaa El Jadida
Victors  –  Motema Pembe — postponed due to a waterlogged pitch
Saint Eloi Lupopo  1–0  Nchanga Rangers
Ismaily  2–0  Sofapaka
Al-Nil Al-Hasahesa  1–1  Missile

Ice hockey
NCAA Division I Women's Frozen Four in Erie, Pennsylvania:
Wisconsin 3, Boston College 2
Boston University 4, Cornell 1

Ski jumping
World Cup in Planica, Slovenia:
HS 215 (ski flying):  Gregor Schlierenzauer  450.9 points  Thomas Morgenstern  448.1  Martin Koch  433.8
Ski flying standings (after 6 of 7 events): (1) Schlierenzauer 425 points (2) Koch 361 (3) Morgenstern 342
Overall standings (after 25 of 26 events): (1) Morgenstern 1721 points (2) Simon Ammann  1349 (3) Andreas Kofler  1120

Snowboarding
World Cup in Valmalenco, Italy:
Men's snowboard cross:  Alberto Schiavon   Jonathan Cheever   Nate Holland 
Snowboard cross standings (after 5 of 7 races): (1) Cheever 2490 points (2) Pierre Vaultier  2090 (3) Holland 1860
Overall standings: (1) Benjamin Karl  5210 points (2) Roland Fischnaller  4400 (3) Andreas Prommegger  3940
Women's snowboard cross:  Lindsey Jacobellis      Déborah Anthonioz 
Snowboard cross standings (after 5 of 7 races): (1) Dominique Maltais  4300 points (2) Jacobellis 2450 (3) Anthonioz 2360
Overall standings: (1) Yekaterina Tudegesheva  5890 points (2) Fränzi Mägert-Kohli  4410 (3) Maltais 4300

March 17, 2011 (Thursday)

Alpine skiing
Men's World Cup in Lenzerheide, Switzerland:
Super-G: Cancelled due to rain.
Final Super-G standings: (1) Didier Cuche  291 points (2) Georg Streitberger  227 (3) Ivica Kostelić  223
Cuche wins his first Super-G World Cup, and his sixth world title overall.
Overall standings (after 35 of 37 races): (1) Kostelić 1356 points (2) Cuche 956 (3) Carlo Janka  793
Women's World Cup in Lenzerheide, Switzerland:
Super-G: Cancelled due to rain.
Final Super-G standings: (1) Lindsey Vonn  560 points (2) Maria Riesch  389 (3) Julia Mancuso  315
Vonn wins her third consecutive Super-G World Cup title.
Overall standings (after 32 of 34 races): (1) Vonn 1705 points (2) Riesch 1678 (3) Tina Maze  1039

Basketball
NCAA Division I Men's Tournament (seeds in parentheses):
East Regional, second round:
In Tampa, Florida:
(5) West Virginia 84, (12) Clemson 76
(4) Kentucky 59, (13) Princeton 57
Southeast Regional, second round:
In Washington, D.C.:
(8) Butler 60, (9) Old Dominion 58
(1) Pittsburgh 74, (16) UNC Asheville 51
In Tampa, Florida:
(2) Florida 79, (15) UC–Santa Barbara 51
(7) UCLA 78, (10) Michigan State 76
In Denver, Colorado:
(3) BYU 74, (14) Wofford 66
(11) Gonzaga 86, (6) St. John's 71
In Tucson, Arizona:
(4) Wisconsin 72, (13) Belmont 58
(5) Kansas State 73, (12) Utah State 68
Southwest Regional, second round:
In Denver, Colorado:
(13) Morehead State 62, (4) Louisville 61
(12) Richmond 69, (5) Vanderbilt 66
West Regional, second round:
In Tucson, Arizona:
(7) Temple 66, (10) Penn State 64
(2) San Diego State 68, (15) Northern Colorado 50
In Washington, D.C.:
(3) Connecticut 81, (14) Bucknell 52
(6) Cincinnati 78, (11) Missouri 63
EuroCup Women Final, first leg:
Elitzur Ramla  61–61  ASPTT Arras

Biathlon
World Cup 9 in Holmenkollen, Norway:
Women's 7.5 km Sprint:  Magdalena Neuner  21:04.6 (0+1)  Tora Berger  21:35.9 (0+1)  Darya Domracheva  21:50.7 (0+2)
Final sprint standings: (1) Neuner 404 points (2) Kaisa Mäkäräinen  391 (3) Berger 356
Neuner wins her second sprint World Cup, and her seventh discipline title.
Overall standings (after 24 of 26 races): (1) Mäkäräinen 936 points (2) Neuner 914 (3) Helena Ekholm  911
Men's 10 km Sprint:  Andreas Birnbacher  26:14.6 (0+0)  Björn Ferry  26:24.8 (0+0)  Alexander Wolf  26:58.6 (0+0)
Final sprint standings: (1) Tarjei Bø  393 points (2) Emil Hegle Svendsen  369 (3) Arnd Peiffer  333
Bø wins his first World Cup discipline title.
Overall standings (after 24 of 26 races): (1) Bø 1022 points (2) Svendsen 985 (3) Martin Fourcade  906

Cricket
World Cup (team in bold advances to the quarter-finals):
Group B:  243 (48.4 overs);  225 (44.4 overs) in Chennai, India. England win by 18 runs.
Standings:  8 points (5 matches),  7 (5), England 7 (6), West Indies,  6 (5),  2 (5),  0 (5).

Darts
Premier League, week 6 in Glasgow, Scotland:
Terry Jenkins  6–8 James Wade 
Raymond van Barneveld  8–4 Mark Webster 
Simon Whitlock  5–8 Phil Taylor 
Gary Anderson  3–8 Adrian Lewis 
Standings (after 6 matches): Taylor 10 points, Anderson, van Barneveld 8, Lewis 6, Whitlock, Webster, Jenkins, Wade 4.

Football (soccer)
UEFA Europa League Round of 16, second leg (first leg scores in parentheses):
Paris Saint-Germain  1–1 (1–2)  Benfica. Benfica win 3–2 on aggregate.
Manchester City  1–0 (0–2)  Dynamo Kyiv. Dynamo Kyiv win 2–1 on aggregate.
Zenit St. Petersburg  2–0 (0–3)  Twente. Twente win 3–2 on aggregate.
Spartak Moscow  3–0 (1–0)  Ajax. Spartak Moscow win 4–0 on aggregate.
Porto  2–1 (1–0)  CSKA Moscow. Porto win 3–1 on aggregate.
Rangers  0–1 (0–0)  PSV Eindhoven. PSV Eindhoven win 1–0 on aggregate.
Villarreal  2–1 (3–2)  Bayer Leverkusen. Villarreal win 5–3 on aggregate.
Liverpool  0–0 (0–1)  Braga. Braga win 1–0 on aggregate.
UEFA Women's Champions League Quarter-finals, first leg:
Zvezda 2005 Perm  0–0  Lyon
Arsenal  1–1  Linköpings
Everton  1–3  Duisburg
Copa Libertadores Second Stage (team in bold advances to the knockout stage):
Group 2:
León de Huánuco  1–1  Grêmio
Junior  2–1  Oriente Petrolero
Standings (after 4 matches): Junior 12 points, Grêmio 7, León de Huánuco 4, Oriente Petrolero 0.
Group 7: Estudiantes  5–1  Guaraní
Standings (after 4 matches):  Cruzeiro 10 points, Estudiantes 9,  Deportes Tolima 4, Guaraní 0.
Group 8: LDU Quito  5–0  Peñarol
Standings: LDU Quito 6 points (4 matches),  Godoy Cruz 6 (3), Peñarol 6 (4),  Independiente 3 (3).

March 16, 2011 (Wednesday)

Alpine skiing
Men's World Cup in Lenzerheide, Switzerland:
Downhill:  Adrien Théaux  1:22.94  Joachim Puchner  1:22.95  Aksel Lund Svindal  1:23.10
Final downhill standings: (1) Didier Cuche  510 points (2) Michael Walchhofer  498 (3) Klaus Kröll  411
Cuche wins his fourth downhill World Cup in five seasons.
Overall standings (after 35 of 38 races): (1) Ivica Kostelić  1356 points (2) Cuche 956 (3) Carlo Janka  793
Women's World Cup in Lenzerheide, Switzerland:
Downhill:  Julia Mancuso  1:27.50  Lara Gut  1:28.31  Elisabeth Görgl  1:28.65
Final downhill standings: (1) Lindsey Vonn  650 points (2) Maria Riesch  457 (3) Mancuso 367
Vonn wins her fourth consecutive downhill World Cup title.
Overall standings (after 32 of 35 races): (1) Vonn 1705 points (2) Riesch 1678 (3) Tina Maze  1039

Basketball
NCAA Division I Men's Tournament:
First Four in Dayton, Ohio:
Texas–San Antonio 70, Alabama State 61
VCU 59, Southern California 46
 Russian Cup Final:
BC Spartak Saint Petersburg 80–53 BC Nizhny Novgorod
Spartak win the Cup for the third time.

Cricket
World Cup (teams in bold advance to the quarter-finals):
Group A:  211 (45.4 overs);  212/3 (34.5 overs) in Bangalore, India. Australia win by 7 wickets.
Standings: Australia 9 points (5 matches),  8 (5),  7 (5),  2 (5), Canada 2 (6),  0 (5).

Cross-country skiing
World Cup Final:
Stage 1 in Stockholm, Sweden:
Men's sprint classical:  Emil Jönsson  2:12.4  Petter Northug  2:15.5  Ola Vigen Hattestad  2:15.7
Final sprint standings: (1) Jönsson 580 points (2) Hattestad 407 (3) Jesper Modin  300
Jönsson wins his second consecutive sprint World Cup.
Overall standings (after 28 of 31 races): (1) Dario Cologna  1391 points (2) Northug 940 (3) Daniel Rickardsson  834
Women's sprint classical:  Petra Majdič  2:28.4  Marit Bjørgen  2:31.2  Maiken Caspersen Falla  2:32.4
Final sprint standings: (1) Majdič 480 points (2) Arianna Follis  434 (3) Kikkan Randall  427
Majdič wins the sprint title for the third time in four seasons.
Overall standings (after 28 of 31 races): (1) Justyna Kowalczyk  1821 points (2) Bjørgen 1278 (3) Follis 1136

Football (soccer)
South American Under-17 Championship in Ecuador:
Group B:
 2–1 
 3–1 
Standings: Brazil 6 points (2 matches), Colombia 4 (2), Chile 1 (2), Paraguay 0 (1).
UEFA Champions League Round of 16, second leg (first leg score in parentheses):
Chelsea  0–0 (2–0)  Copenhagen. Chelsea win 2–0 on aggregate.
Real Madrid  3–0 (1–1)  Lyon. Real Madrid win 4–1 on aggregate.
Copa Libertadores Second Stage:
Group 5: Colo-Colo  3–2  Santos
Standings (after 3 matches): Colo-Colo 6 points,  Cerro Porteño 5, Santos,  Deportivo Táchira 2.
Group 6:
Jorge Wilstermann  1–4  Internacional
Emelec  1–0  Chiapas
Standings: Internacional 7 points (3 matches), Emelec 7 (4), Jaguares 6 (4), Jorge Wilstermann 0 (3).
Group 7: Cruzeiro  6–1  Deportes Tolima
Standings: Cruzeiro 10 points (4 matches),  Estudiantes 6 (3), Deportes Tolima 4 (4),  Guaraní 0 (3).
AFC Champions League group stage, matchday 2:
Group B: Al-Sadd  2–1  Pakhtakor
Standings (after 2 matches):  Al-Nassr, Al-Sadd 4 points, Pakhtakor,  Esteghlal 1.
Group C:
Bunyodkor  0–1  Al-Ittihad
Persepolis  1–1  Al-Wahda
Standings (after 2 matches): Al-Ittihad 6 points, Al-Wahda 2, Bunyodkor, Persepolis 1.
Group D:
Emirates  2–0  Al-Rayyan
Al-Shabab  0–0  Zob Ahan
Standings (after 2 matches): Zob Ahan 4 points, Emirates 3, Al-Shabab 2, Al-Rayyan 1.
Group G:
Shandong Luneng  2–0  Cerezo Osaka
Arema FC  0–4  Jeonbuk Hyundai Motors
Standings (after 2 matches): Jeonbuk Hyundai Motors 6 points, Shandong Luneng, Cerezo Osaka 3, Arema FC 0.
Group H:
Kashima Antlers  –  Sydney FC — postponed due to the Tōhoku earthquake
Suwon Samsung Bluewings  4–0  Shanghai Shenhua
Standings: Suwon Bluewings 4 points (2 matches), Kashima Antlers, Sydney FC 1 (1), Shanghai Shenhua 1 (2).
AFC Cup group stage, matchday 2:
Group C:
Duhok  4–2  Al-Faisaly
Al-Jaish  2–1  Al-Nasr
Standings (after 2 matches): Duhok 6 points, Al-Faisaly, Al-Jaish 3, Al-Nasr 0.
Group D:
Al-Wehdat  5–1  Al-Suwaiq
Al-Kuwait  1–0  Al-Talaba
Standings (after 2 matches): Al-Wehdat, Al-Kuwait 6 points, Al-Talaba, Al-Suwaiq 0.
Group G:
Hà Nội T&T  2–0  Victory
Tampines Rovers  1–1  Muangthong United
Standings (after 2 matches): Muangthong United, Tampines Rovers 4 points, Hà Nội T&T 3, Victory 0.
Group H:
Persipura Jayapura  4–1  Kingfisher East Bengal
Chonburi  3–0  South China
Standings (after 2 matches): Chonburi, Persipura Jayapura 4 points, Kingfisher East Bengal, South China 1.
CONCACAF Champions League Semifinals, first leg:
Monterrey  2–1  Cruz Azul
UEFA Women's Champions League Quarter-finals, first leg:
Juvisy  0–3  Turbine Potsdam

March 15, 2011 (Tuesday)

Basketball
NCAA Division I Men's Tournament:
First Four in Dayton, Ohio:
UNC Asheville 81, Arkansas–Little Rock 77 (OT)
Clemson 70, UAB 52

Cricket
World Cup (team in bold advances to the quarter-finals):
Group B:  272/7 (50 overs);  141 (33.2 overs) in Kolkata, India. South Africa win by 131 runs.
Standings: South Africa 8 points (5 matches),  7 (5),  6 (4),  6 (5),  5 (5), Ireland 2 (5),  0 (5).

Cycling
UCI World Tour:
Tirreno–Adriatico, Stage 7:  Fabian Cancellara  10' 33"  Lars Boom  + 9"  Adriano Malori  + 19"
Final general classification: (1) Cadel Evans   27h 37' 37" (2) Robert Gesink   + 11" (3) Michele Scarponi   + 15"
World Tour standings (after 3 of 27 races): (1) Evans & Tony Martin  108 points (3) Cameron Meyer  106

Football (soccer)
South American Under-17 Championship in Ecuador:
Group A:
 1–1 
 0–2 
Standings: Ecuador 4 points (2 matches), Uruguay 3 (1), Peru 1 (2), Bolivia 0 (2).
UEFA Champions League Round of 16, second leg (first leg score in parentheses):
Manchester United  2–1 (0–0)  Marseille. Manchester United win 2–1 on aggregate.
Bayern Munich  2–3 (1–0)  Internazionale. 3–3 on aggregate; Internazionale win on away goals.
Copa Libertadores Second Stage (team in bold advances to the knockout stage):
Group 1:
Universidad San Martín  0–1  Libertad
Once Caldas  1–1  San Luis
Standings (after 4 matches): Libertad 10 points, Universidad San Martín 6, Once Caldas 3, San Luis 2.
Group 3: Argentinos Juniors  0–1  Nacional
Standings: Argentinos Juniors 7 points (4 matches),  América 6 (3), Nacional 4 (4),  Fluminense 2 (3).
AFC Champions League group stage, matchday 2:
Group A:
Al-Gharafa  0–1  Al-Hilal
Sepahan  5–1  Al-Jazira
Standings (after 2 matches): Sepahan 6 points, Al-Hilal 3, Al-Gharafa, Al-Jazira 1.
Group B: Al-Nassr  2–1  Esteghlal
Standings: Al-Nassr 4 points (2 matches),  Pakhtakor,  Al-Sadd 1 (1), Esteghlal 1 (2).
Group E:
Melbourne Victory  1–2  Jeju United
Tianjin Teda  2–1  Gamba Osaka
Standings (after 2 matches): Tianjin Teda 6 points, Gamba Osaka, Jeju United 3, Melbourne Victory 0.
Group F:
Nagoya Grampus  –  Al-Ain — postponed due to the Tōhoku earthquake
FC Seoul  3–0  Hangzhou Greentown
Standings: FC Seoul 6 points (2 matches), Hangzhou Greentown 3 (2), Al-Ain, Nagoya Grampus 0 (1).
AFC Cup group stage, matchday 2:
Group A:
Al-Tilal  2–3  Nasaf Qarshi
Al-Ansar  2–0  Dempo
Standings (after 2 matches): Nasaf Qarshi 6 points, Al-Ansar, Dempo 3, Al-Tilal 0.
Group B:
Shurtan Guzar  7–2  Al-Saqr
Al-Ittihad  0–2  Al-Qadsia
Standings (after 2 matches): Al-Qadsia 6 points, Shurtan Guzar, Al-Ittihad 3, Al-Saqr 0.
Group E:
Arbil  1–1  Al-Karamah
Al-Oruba  1–0  Al Ahed
Standings (after 2 matches): Al-Oruba, Arbil 4 points, Al-Karamah 2, Al Ahed 0.
Group F:
VB  1–3  Sông Lam Nghệ An
TSW Pegasus  1–2  Sriwijaya
Standings (after 2 matches): Sriwijaya 4 points, Sông Lam Nghệ An, TSW Pegasus 3, VB 1.
CONCACAF Champions League Semifinals, first leg:
Real Salt Lake  2–0  Saprissa

March 14, 2011 (Monday)

Cricket
World Cup (teams in bold advance to the quarter-finals):
Group A:  151/7 (39.4/43 overs);  164/3 (34.1/38 overs) in Kandy, Sri Lanka. Pakistan win by 7 wickets (D/L).
Standings: , Pakistan 8 points (5 matches),  7 (5),  7 (4), Zimbabwe,  2 (5),  0 (5).
Group B:  160 (46.2 overs);  166/4 (41.2 overs) in Chittagong, Bangladesh. Bangladesh win by 6 wickets.
Standings:  7 points (5 matches),  6 (4), Bangladesh 6 (5),  5 (5),  2 (4), Netherlands 0 (5).

Cycling
UCI World Tour:
Tirreno–Adriatico, Stage 6:  Cadel Evans   4h 37' 58"  Giovanni Visconti  s.t.  Michele Scarponi  s.t.
General classification (after stage 6): (1) Evans  27h 26' 33" (2) Scarponi  + 9" (3) Ivan Basso + 12"

Snooker
Hainan Classic in Boao, China:
Final: John Higgins  7–2 Jamie Cope 
Higgins wins his 36th professional title.

March 13, 2011 (Sunday)

Alpine skiing
Men's World Cup in Kvitfjell, Norway:
Super-G:  Didier Cuche  1:33.05  Klaus Kröll  1:33.35  Joachim Puchner  1:33.39
Super G standings (after 6 of 7 races): (1) Cuche 291 points (2) Georg Streitberger  227 (3) Ivica Kostelić  223
Overall standings (after 34 of 38 races): (1) Kostelić 1356 points (2) Cuche 906 (3) Carlo Janka  767

Badminton
BWF Super Series:
All England Super Series in Birmingham:
Men's singles: Lee Chong Wei  def. Lin Dan  21–17, 21–17
Women's singles: Wang Shixian  def. Eriko Hirose  24–22, 21–18
Men's doubles: Mathias Boe/Carsten Mogensen  def. Koo Kien Keat/Tan Boon Heong  15–21, 21–18, 21–18
Women's doubles: Wang Xiaoli/Yu Yang  vs. Mizuki Fujii/Reika Kakiiwa  21–2, 21–9
Mixed doubles: Xu Chen/Ma Jin  vs. Sudket Prapakamol/Saralee Thungthongkam  21–13, 21–9

Basketball
U.S. college conference championship games:
Men's (winners advance to the NCAA tournament):
Atlantic Coast Conference in Greensboro, North Carolina: Duke 75, North Carolina 58
Atlantic 10 Conference in Atlantic City, New Jersey: Richmond 67, Dayton 54
Big Ten Conference in Indianapolis: Ohio State 71, Penn State 60
Southeastern Conference in Atlanta: Kentucky 70, Florida 54
Women's (winners advance to the NCAA tournament):
Big South Conference in High Point, North Carolina: Gardner–Webb 67, Liberty 66
Colonial Athletic Association in Upper Marlboro, Maryland: James Madison 67, Delaware 61
Horizon League in Green Bay, Wisconsin: Green Bay 74, Butler 63
Missouri Valley Conference in St. Charles, Missouri: Northern Iowa 69, Missouri State 41
Northeast Conference in Loretto, Pennsylvania: St. Francis (PA) 72, Monmouth 57
News: The International Basketball Federation (FIBA) decide that the British men and women national teams will automatically qualify for the 2012 Olympics in London.

Biathlon
World Championships in Khanty-Mansiysk, Russia:
Women's relay:   (Andrea Henkel, Miriam Gössner, Tina Bachmann, Magdalena Neuner) 1:13:31.1 (2+13)   (Valj Semerenko, Vita Semerenko, Olena Pidhrushna, Oksana Khvostenko) 1:13:55.6 (0+4)   (Anais Bescond, Marie-Laure Brunet, Sophie Boilley, Marie Dorin) 1:14:18.3 (0+9)
Bachmann and Gössner win their first world titles. Henkel wins the title for the third time, and seventh overall, and Neuner also wins the title for the third time, for her fourth title of the championships and tenth overall.
Final World Cup standings: (1) Germany 206 points (2)  188 (3) Ukraine 185

Cricket
World Cup (teams in bold advance to the quarter-finals):
Group A:
 358/6 (50 overs; Brendon McCullum 101);  261/9 (50 overs) in Mumbai, India. New Zealand win by 97 runs.
 324/6 (50 overs);  264/6 (50 overs) in Bangalore, India. Australia win by 60 runs.
Standings: New Zealand 8 points (5 matches),  7 (5), Australia 7 (4),  6 (4),  2 (4), Canada 2 (5), Kenya 0 (5).

Cross-country skiing
World Cup in Lahti, Finland:
Men's sprint classical:  Emil Jönsson  3:08.7  Eirik Brandsdal  3:09.4  Pål Golberg  3:09.7
Sprint standings (after 10 of 11 races): (1) Jönsson 530 points (2) Ola Vigen Hattestad  364 (3) Alexei Petukhov  277
Overall standings (after 27 of 31 races): (1) Dario Cologna  1367 points (2) Petter Northug  894 (3) Daniel Rickardsson  829
Women's sprint classical:  Marit Bjørgen  3:30.2  Astrid Uhrenholdt Jacobsen  3:33.2  Petra Majdič  3:34.1
Sprint standings (after 10 of 11 races): (1) Majdič 430 points (2) Arianna Follis  423 (3) Kikkan Randall  401
Overall standings (after 27 of 31 races): (1) Justyna Kowalczyk  1789 points (2) Bjørgen 1232 (3) Follis 1125

Cycling
UCI World Tour:
Paris–Nice, Stage 8:  Thomas Voeckler  3h 15' 58"  Diego Ulissi  + 23"  Julien El Fares  + 1' 06"
Final general classification: (1) Tony Martin   34h 03' 37" (2) Andreas Klöden   + 36" (3) Bradley Wiggins  + 41"
World Tour standings (after 2 of 27 races): (1) Martin 108 points (2) Cameron Meyer  106 (3) Matthew Goss  103
Tirreno–Adriatico, Stage 5:  Philippe Gilbert  6h 43' 23"  Wout Poels  s.t.  Damiano Cunego  s.t.
General classification (after stage 5): (1) Cadel Evans   22h 48' 45" (2) Ivan Basso  + 2" (3) Cunego + 3"

Diving
European Championships in Turin, Italy:
Men's 10 m platform:  Sascha Klein  515.05 points  Patrick Hausding  506.10  Oleksandr Bondar  493.95
Women's 3 m springboard synchro:  Tania Cagnotto/Francesca Dallapé  320.40 points  Nadezhda Bazhina/Svetlana Philippova  317.13  Katja Dieckow/Uschi Freitag  295.50

Football (soccer)
South American Under-17 Championship in Ecuador:
Group B:
 4–3 
 2–2 
 A-League Grand Final in Brisbane:
Brisbane Roar 2–2 (4–2 pen.) Central Coast Mariners
Brisbane win the title for the first time.

Freestyle skiing
World Cup in Branas, Sweden:
Men's ski cross:  Andreas Matt   Christopher Del Bosco   Conradign Netzer 
ski cross standings (after 10 of 11 events): (1) Matt 779 points (2) Del Bosco 515 (3) Jouni Pellinen  422
Overall standings: (1) Matt 78 points (2) Guilbaut Colas  74 (3) Alexandre Bilodeau  68
Women's ski cross:  Anna Holmlund   Kelsey Serwa   Marte Høie Gjefsen 
ski cross standings (after 10 of 11 events): (1) Holmlund 572 points (2) Heidi Zacher  567 (3) Serwa 530
Overall standings: (1) Hannah Kearney  91 points (2) Jennifer Heil  & Cheng Shuang  63

Golf
World Golf Championships:
WGC-Cadillac Championship in Doral, Florida, United States:
Winner: Nick Watney  272 (−16)
Watney wins his first WGC title, and his third PGA Tour title.
PGA Tour:
Puerto Rico Open in Río Grande, Puerto Rico:
Winner: Michael Bradley  272 (−16)PO
Bradley defeats Troy Matteson  on the first playoff hole, to win the title for the second time in three years, and his fourth PGA Tour title.
Champions Tour:
Toshiba Classic in Newport Beach, California:
Winner: Nick Price  196 (−17)
Price wins his fourth Champions Tour title.

Rugby union
Six Nations Championship, Week 4:
Calcutta Cup:  22–16  in London
Standings (after 4 matches): England 8 points,  6,  4,  2, Scotland 0.

Short track speed skating
World Championships in Sheffield, Great Britain:
Men's 1000 m: (1) Noh Jin-Kyu  1:28.552 (2) Charles Hamelin  1:28.663 (3) Liang Wenhao  1:29.203
Men's 3000 m: (1) Noh 4:51.638 (2) Liang 4:51.877 (3) Jeff Simon  4:52.181
Final standings:  Noh 102 points  Hamelin 50  Liang 47
Women's 1000 m: (1) Cho Ha-Ri  1:38.895 (2) Arianna Fontana  1:40.306 (3) Katherine Reutter  2:23.268
Women's 3000 m: (1) Cho 5:13.353 (2) Reutter 5:13.677 (3) Liu Qiuhong  5:17.206
Final standings:  Cho 81 points  Reutter 68  Fontana 57
Men's 5000 m relay:   (Michael Gilday, Charles Hamelin, François Hamelin, Olivier Jean) 6:52.731   (Paul Herrmann, Christoph Milz, Robert Seifert) 6:54.693   (Kyle Carr, Travis Jayner, Anthony Lobello Jr., Simon) 7:01.659

Ski jumping
World Cup in Lahti, Finland:
HS 130:  Simon Ammann  286.8 points  Andreas Kofler  282.3  Severin Freund  280.0
Standings (after 24 of 26 events): (1) Thomas Morgenstern  1641 points (2) Ammann 1309 (3) Kofler 1096

Snowboarding
World Cup in Bardonecchia, Italy:
Men's Slopestyle:  Alexey Sobolev  25.0 points  Milu Multhaup-Appleton  24.3  Clemens Schattschneider  23.1
Final Big Air/Slopestyle standings: (1) Schattschneider 2960 points (2) Sebastien Toutant  2220 (3) Rocco van Straten  1845
Freestyle overall standings: (1) Schattschneider 3108 points (2) Nathan Johnstone  3060 (3) Ryō Aono  2800
Women's Slopestyle:    22.6 points  Anja Stefan  22.0  Lou Chabelard  19.6
Final Slopestyle standings: (1) Allyson Carroll  & Rusin 1000 points (3) Stefan & Brooke Voigt  800
Freestyle overall standings: (1) Cai Xuetong  3800 points (2) Holly Crawford  3100 (3) Mirabelle Thovex  1950

Speed skating
World Single Distance Championships in Inzell, Germany:
Women's 500 m: (1) Jenny Wolf  1:15.93 (37.98 / 37.95) (2) Lee Sang-hwa  1:16.17 (38.14 / 38.03) (3) Wang Beixing  1:16.39 (38.35 / 38.04)
Men's 500 m: (1) Lee Kyou-hyuk  1:09.10 (34.78 / 34.32) (2) Joji Kato  1:09.42 (34.90 / 34.52) (3) Jan Smeekens  1:09.43 (34.77 / 34.66)
Women's team pursuit:   (Christine Nesbitt, Brittany Schussler, Cindy Klassen) 2:59.74   (Ireen Wüst, Diane Valkenburg, Marrit Leenstra) 3:00.43   (Stephanie Beckert, Isabell Ost, Claudia Pechstein) 3:01.82
Men's team pursuit:   (Shani Davis, Trevor Marsicano, Jonathan Kuck) 3:41.72   (Denny Morrison, Lucas Makowsky, Mathieu Giroux) 3:41.85   (Bob de Vries, Jan Blokhuijsen, Koen Verweij) 3:43.44

March 12, 2011 (Saturday)

Alpine skiing
Women's World Cup in Špindlerův Mlýn, Czech Republic:
Slalom:  Marlies Schild  1:43.85 (50.02 / 53.83)  Kathrin Zettel  1:44.78 (50.20 / 54.58)  Tina Maze  1:45.01 (50.74 / 54.27)
Slalom standings (after 8 of 9 races): (1) Schild 600 points (2) Tanja Poutiainen  489 (3) Maria Riesch  420
Schild wins her third slalom World Cup title.
Overall standings (after 31 of 35 races): (1) Riesch 1678 points (2) Lindsey Vonn  1655 (3) Maze 1003
Men's World Cup in Kvitfjell, Norway:
Downhill:  Michael Walchhofer  1:45.92  Klaus Kröll  1:46.05  Beat Feuz  1:46.23
Downhill standings (after 8 of 9 races): (1) Walchhofer 474 points (2) Didier Cuche  460 (3) Kröll 395
Overall standings (after 33 of 38 races): (1) Ivica Kostelić  1324 points (2) Cuche 806 (3) Carlo Janka  738
Kostelić becomes the first Croatian man to win the overall World Cup title, and the second Croatian ever, after sister Janica.

Basketball
U.S. college conference championship games:
Men's (winners advance to the NCAA tournament):
America East Conference in Boston: Boston University 56, Stony Brook 54
Big 12 Conference in Kansas City, Missouri: Kansas 85, Texas 73
Big East Conference in New York City: Connecticut 69, Louisville 66
Big West Conference in Anaheim, California: UC Santa Barbara 64, Long Beach State 56
Conference USA in El Paso, Texas: Memphis 67, UTEP 66
Ivy League one-game playoff in New Haven, Connecticut: Princeton 63, Harvard 62
Mid-America Conference in Cleveland: Akron 66, Kent State 65 (OT)
MEAC in Winston-Salem, North Carolina: Hampton 60, Morgan State 55
Mountain West Conference in Paradise, Nevada: San Diego State 72, BYU 54
Pacific-10 Conference in Los Angeles: Washington 77, Arizona 75 (OT)
Southland Conference in Katy, Texas: UTSA 75, McNeese State 72
SWAC in Garland, Texas: Alabama State 65, Grambling State 48
Western Athletic Conference in Paradise, Nevada: Utah State 77, Boise State 69
Other men's conference championship game (winner does not receive an automatic bid):
Great West Conference in Orem, Utah: North Dakota 77, South Dakota 76 (2OT)
Women's (winners advance to the NCAA tournament):
America East Conference in Hartford, Connecticut: Hartford 65, Boston University 53
Big 12 Conference in Kansas City, Missouri: Baylor 61, Texas A&M 58
Big Sky Conference in Portland, Oregon: Montana 62, Portland State 58
Big West Conference in Anaheim, California: UC Davis 66, Cal Poly 49
Conference USA in El Paso, Texas: UCF 85, Tulane 73
Mid-America Conference in Cleveland: Bowling Green 51, Eastern Michigan 46
MEAC in Winston-Salem, North Carolina: Hampton 61, Howard 42
Mountain West Conference in Paradise, Nevada: Utah 52, TCU 47 (OT)
Pacific-10 Conference in Los Angeles: Stanford 64, UCLA 55
Patriot League in Annapolis, Maryland: Navy 47, American 40
SWAC in Garland, Texas: Prairie View A&M 48, Southern 44
Western Athletic Conference in Paradise, Nevada: Fresno State 78, Louisiana Tech 76
Other women's conference championship game (winner does not receive an automatic bid):
Great West Conference in Orem, Utah: Chicago State 74, North Dakota 66

Biathlon
World Championships in Khanty-Mansiysk, Russia:
Men's Mass start:  Emil Hegle Svendsen  38:42.7 (0+0+0+1)  Evgeny Ustyugov  38:47.7 (0+0+0+0)  Lukas Hofer  38:57.0 (0+0+0+1)
Svendsen wins his second title of the championships, and fifth overall.
World Cup mass start standings (after 4 of 5 races): (1) Martin Fourcade  194 points (2) Svendsen 184 (3) Tarjei Bø  177
World Cup overall standings (after 23 of 26 races): (1) Bø 1022 points (2) Svendsen 947 (3) Fourcade 900
Women's Mass start:  Magdalena Neuner  36:48.5 (0+1+2+1)  Darya Domracheva  36:53.3 (2+1+0+0)  Tora Berger  37:02.5 (2+1+0+0)
Neuner wins her second title of the championships, and ninth overall.
World Cup mass start standings (after 4 of 5 races): (1) Neuner 190 points (2) Berger 181 (3) Domracheva 176
World Cup overall standings (after 23 of 26 races): (1) Kaisa Mäkäräinen  914 points (2) Helena Ekholm  907 (3) Neuner 854

Cricket
World Cup:
Group B:  296 (48.4 overs; Sachin Tendulkar 111, Dale Steyn 5/50);  300/7 (49.4 overs) in Nagpur, India. South Africa win by 3 wickets.
Standings: India 7 points (5 matches), South Africa 6 (4),  5 (5),  4 (4),  2 (4),  0 (4).

Cross-country skiing
World Cup in Lahti, Finland:
Men's 20 km pursuit:  Dario Cologna  47:31.3  Maurice Manificat  47:31.9  Vincent Vittoz  47:32.3
Distance standings (after 15 of 17 races): (1) Cologna 651 points (2) Daniel Rickardsson  501 (3) Lukáš Bauer  491
Overall standings (after 26 of 31 races): (1) Cologna 1367 points (2) Petter Northug  894 (3) Rickardsson 816
Women's 10 km pursuit:  Therese Johaug  25:43.9  Justyna Kowalczyk  25:43.9  Arianna Follis  26:07.4
Distance standings (after 15 of 17 races): (1) Kowalczyk 947 points (2) Marit Bjørgen  675 (3) Johaug 585
Overall standings (after 26 of 31 races): (1) Kowalczyk 1739 points (2) Bjørgen 1132 (3) Follis 1085

Cycling
UCI World Tour:
Paris–Nice, Stage 7:  Rémy Di Gregorio  5h 46' 23"  Samuel Sánchez  + 5"  Rigoberto Urán  + 5"
General classification (after stage 7): (1) Tony Martin   30h 46' 17" (2) Andreas Klöden   + 36" (3) Bradley Wiggins  + 41"
Tirreno–Adriatico, Stage 4:  Michele Scarponi  6h 10' 59"  Damiano Cunego  s.t.  Cadel Evans  s.t.
General classification (after stage 4): (1) Robert Gesink   16h 05' 10" (2) Cadel Evans  + 10" (3) Ivan Basso  + 12"

Diving
European Championships in Turin, Italy:
Men's 10 m platform synchro:  Sascha Klein/Patrick Hausding  467.16 points  Oleksandr Bondar/Oleksandr Gorshkovozov  458.34  Victor Minibaev/Ilya Zakharov  441.15
Women's 3 m springboard:  Anna Lindberg  347.10 points  Nadezhda Bazhina  325.55  Tania Cagnotto  324.25

Equestrianism
Show jumping:
FEI World Cup North American League – East Coast:
14th competition in Wellington, Florida (CSI 4*-W):  Rodrigo Pessoa  on Let's Fly  Nick Skelton  on Carlo  Lauren Hough  on Quick Study
Standings (after 13 of 14 competitions): (1) Michelle Spadone  107 points (2) Margie Goldstein-Engle  102 (3) McLain Ward  96

Football (soccer)
South American Under-17 Championship in Ecuador:
Group A:
 2–1 
 4–2

Freestyle skiing
World Cup in Åre, Sweden:
Men's dual moguls:  Alexandre Bilodeau  20.00 points  Guilbaut Colas  15.00  Patrick Deneen  35.00
Moguls standings (after 10 of 11 events): (1) Colas 741 points (2) Bilodeau 679 (3) Mikaël Kingsbury  645
Overall standings: (1) Andreas Matt  75 points (2) Colas 74 (3) Bilodeau 68
Women's dual moguls:  Hannah Kearney  23.00 points  Justine Dufour-Lapointe  12.00  Jennifer Heil  18.00
Moguls standings (after 10 of 11 events): (1) Kearney 909 points (2) Heil 632 (3) Audrey Robichaud  421
Overall standings: (1) Kearney 91 points (2) Heil & Cheng Shuang  63

Mixed martial arts
Zuffa, the parent company of the UFC, has purchased the rival Strikeforce promotion, with an official announcement expected on March 14. Zuffa will continue to operate Strikeforce as a separate promotion.

Nordic combined
World Cup in Lahti, Finland:
HS 130 / 10 km:  Johannes Rydzek  24:35.3  Eric Frenzel  24:35.3  Felix Gottwald  24:36.2
Final standings: (1) Jason Lamy-Chappuis  894 points (2) Mikko Kokslien  656 (3) Gottwald 638
Lamy-Chappuis wins his second consecutive World Cup title.

Rugby union
Six Nations Championship, Week 4:
 22–21  in Rome
 19–13  in Cardiff
In Ireland's loss, Ronan O'Gara becomes the fifth player in history to amass 1,000 career points in Tests, and Brian O'Driscoll equals the all-time record of pre-World War II Scotland player Ian Smith for career tries in the Championship with 24.
Standings:  6 points (3 matches), Wales 6 (4), France, Ireland 4 (4), Italy 2 (4),  0 (3).
European Nations Cup First Division, week 4:
 18–11  in Tbilisi
 25–10  in Madrid
 5–41  in Odessa
Standings: Georgia 18 points (4 matches), Russia, Spain 10 (4), Portugal 9 (4), Romania 6 (3), Ukraine 0 (3).

Short track speed skating
World Championships in Sheffield, Great Britain:
Women's 500 m: (1) Fan Kexin  44.620 (2) Arianna Fontana  44.687 (3) Liu Qiuhong  44.784
Men's 500 m: (1) Simon Cho  42.307 (2) Olivier Jean  42.429 (3) Liang Wenhao  42.493

Ski jumping
World Cup in Lahti, Finland:
HS 130 Team:   (Gregor Schlierenzauer, Martin Koch, Andreas Kofler, Thomas Morgenstern) 1086.0 points   (Anders Bardal, Johan Remen Evensen, Anders Jacobsen, Tom Hilde) 1065.3   (Tomasz Byrt, Piotr Żyła, Kamil Stoch, Adam Małysz) 1028.3

Speed skating
World Single Distance Championships in Inzell, Germany:
Women's 1000 m: (1) Christine Nesbitt  1:14.84 (2) Ireen Wüst  1:15.42 (3) Heather Richardson  1:15.45
Men's 10,000 m: (1) Bob de Jong  12:48.20 (2) Bob de Vries  13:04.62 (3) Ivan Skobrev  13:08.17
Women's 5000 m: (1) Martina Sáblíková  6:50.83 (2) Stephanie Beckert  6:54.99 (3) Claudia Pechstein  7:00.90

March 11, 2011 (Friday)

Alpine skiing
Women's World Cup in Špindlerův Mlýn, Czech Republic:
Giant slalom:  Viktoria Rebensburg  2:15.22 (1:06.62 / 1:08.60)  Denise Karbon  2:16.48 (1:07.31 / 1:09.17)  Lindsey Vonn  2:16.67 (1:07.63 / 1:09.04)
Giant slalom standings (after 6 of 7 races): (1) Rebensburg 435 points (2) Tessa Worley  358 (3) Tanja Poutiainen  240
Overall standings (after 30 of 35 races): (1) Maria Riesch  1678 points (2) Vonn 1640 (3) Tina Maze  943
Men's World Cup in Kvitfjell, Norway:
Downhill:  Beat Feuz  1:47.39  Erik Guay  1:47.44  Michael Walchhofer  1:47.50
Downhill standings (after 7 of 9 races): (1) Didier Cuche  424 points (2) Walchhofer 374 (3) Klaus Kröll  315
Overall standings (after 32 of 38 races): (1) Ivica Kostelić  1314 points (2) Cuche 770 (3) Aksel Lund Svindal  725

American football
The National Football League and the National Football League Players Association (NFLPA) break off negotiations for a new collective bargaining agreement. The NFLPA decertifies itself as the players' bargaining agent, and 10 players file an antirust suit against the league in federal court. The NFL responds by locking out the players.

Basketball
U.S. college conference championship games:
Men's (winner advances to the NCAA tournament):
Patriot League in Lewisburg, Pennsylvania: Bucknell 72, Lafayette 57
Women's (winner advances to the NCAA tournament):
Southland Conference in Katy, Texas: McNeese State 71, Central Arkansas 50

Biathlon
World Championships in Khanty-Mansiysk, Russia:
Men's relay:   (Ole Einar Bjørndalen, Alexander Os, Emil Hegle Svendsen, Tarjei Bø) 1:16:13.9 (2+10)   (Anton Shipulin, Evgeny Ustyugov, Maxim Maksimov, Ivan Tcherezov) 1:16:27.3 (0+8)   (Olexander Bilanenko, Andriy Deryzemlya, Serhiy Semenov, Serguei Sednev) 1:16:41.9 (0+10)
Norway wins the event for the second successive time. Bø wins his third title of the championships. Bjørndalen wins his second title of the championships and 16th overall, and his 10th World Championships medal in the relay event. Svendsen win his first title of the championships and fourth overall. Os wins his first title ever.
Final World Cup relay standings: (1) Norway 216 points (2) Germany 199 (3) Ukraine 163

Cricket
World Cup:
Group B:
 275 (50 overs; Devon Smith 107);  231 (49 overs) in Mohali, India. West Indies win by 44 runs.
 225 (49.4 overs);  227/8 (49 overs) in Chittagong, Bangladesh. Bangladesh win by 2 wickets.
Standings:  7 points (4 matches), West Indies 6 (4), England 5 (5),  4 (3), Bangladesh 4 (4), Ireland 2 (4),  0 (4).

Cycling
UCI World Tour:
Paris–Nice, Stage 6:  Tony Martin  33' 24"  Bradley Wiggins  + 20"  Richie Porte  + 29"
General classification (after stage 6): (1) Martin  24h 59' 47" (2) Andreas Klöden   + 36" (3) Wiggins + 39"
Tirreno–Adriatico, Stage 3:  Juan José Haedo  4h 39' 45"  Tyler Farrar   s.t.  Daniel Oss  s.t.
General classification (after stage 3): (1) Farrar  9h 53' 51" (2) Haedo + 5" (3) Lars Boom  + 6"

Diving
European Championships in Turin, Italy:
Men's 3 m springboard synchro:  Evgeny Kuznetsov/Ilya Zakharov  454.68 points  Patrick Hausding/Stephan Feck  441.45  Matthieu Rosset/Damien Cely  425.37
Women's 1 m springboard:  Tania Cagnotto  312.05 points  Nadezhda Bazhina  288.75  Anna Lindberg  287.80
Cagnotto wins her third successive title in this event and her seventh title overall.

Equestrianism
World Dressage Masters:
4th competition in Palm Beach County, Florida (CDI 5*):
Grand Prix Spécial:  Michał Rapcewicz  on Randon  Pierre Saint Jacques  on Lucky Tiger  Shawna Harding  on Come on
Grand Prix Freestyle:  Steffen Peters  on Ravel  Tinne Vilhelmson-Silfven  on Favourit  Tina Konyot  on Calecto V
Rankings (after 3 competitions): (1) Anja Plönzke  1660.5 points (2) Rapcewicz 1378.5 (3) Adelinde Cornelissen  900

Freestyle skiing
World Cup in Åre, Sweden:
Men's Moguls:  Alexandre Bilodeau  26.17 points  Guilbaut Colas  25.80  Mikaël Kingsbury  25.36
Moguls standings (after 9 of 11 events): (1) Colas 661 points (2) Kingsbury 595 (3) Bilodeau 579
Overall standings: (1) Andreas Matt  75 points (2) Colas 73 (3) Kingsbury & Qi Guangpu  66
Women's Moguls:  Hannah Kearney  26.33 points  Jennifer Heil  25.61  Heather McPhie  25.08
Moguls standings (after 9 of 11 events): (1) Kearney 809 points (2) Heil 572 (3) Audrey Robichaud  395
Overall standings: (1) Kearney 90 points (2) Heil 64 (3) Cheng Shuang  63

Nordic combined
World Cup in Lahti, Finland:
HS 130 / 10 km:  Björn Kircheisen  25:28.6  Eric Frenzel  25:34.0  Jason Lamy-Chappuis  25:41.8
Standings (after 12 of 13 races): (1) Lamy-Chappuis 849 points (2) Mikko Kokslien  641 (3) Felix Gottwald  578
Lamy-Chappuis wins his second consecutive World Cup title.

Short track speed skating
World Championships in Sheffield, Great Britain:
Women's 1500 m: (1) Katherine Reutter  2:33.978 (2) Park Seung-Hi  2:34.218 (3) Cho Ha-Ri  2:34.336
Men's 1500 m: (1) Noh Jin-Kyu  2:18.291 (2) Charles Hamelin  2:18.676 (3) Jeff Simon  2:18.725

Snowboarding
World Cup in Bardonecchia, Italy:
Men's halfpipe:  Nathan Johnstone  28.7 points  Johann Baisamy  26.1  Arthur Longo  25.2
Halfpipe standings (after 5 of 6 events): (1) Johnstone 3060 points (2) Ryō Aono  2800 (3) Zhang Yiwei  1470
Freestyle overall standings: (1) Johnstone 3060 points (2) Aono 2800 (3) Clemens Schattschneider  2508
Women's halfpipe:  Holly Crawford  24.7 points  Mirabelle Thovex  23.1  Paulina Ligocka-Andrzejewska  21.6
Halfpipe standings (after 5 of 6 events): (1) Cai Xuetong  3800 points (2) Crawford 3100 (3) Thovex 1950
Freestyle overall standings: (1) Cai 3800 points (2) Crawford 3100 (3) Thovex 1950

Speed skating
World Single Distance Championships in Inzell, Germany:
Men's 1000 m: (1) Shani Davis  1:08.45 (2) Kjeld Nuis  1:08.67 (3) Stefan Groothuis  1:08.73
Women's 1500 m: (1) Ireen Wüst  1:54.80 (2) Diane Valkenburg  1:56.27 (3) Jorien Voorhuis  1:57.30
Men's 5000 m: (1) Bob de Jong  6:15.41 (2) Lee Seung-hoon  6:17.45 (3) Ivan Skobrev  6:17.47

March 10, 2011 (Thursday)

Cricket
World Cup (team in bold advances to the quarter-finals):
Group A:  327/6 (50 overs; Tillakaratne Dilshan 144, Upul Tharanga 133);  188 (39 overs) in Kandy, Sri Lanka. Sri Lanka win by 139 runs.
Standings: Sri Lanka 7 points (5 matches),  6 (4),  5 (3), Zimbabwe,  2 (4),  0 (4).

Cycling
UCI World Tour:
Paris–Nice, Stage 5:  Andreas Klöden  4h 59' 00"  Samuel Sánchez  s.t.  Matteo Carrara   s.t.
General classification (after stage 5): (1) Klöden  24h 26' 13" (2) Sánchez + 4" (3) Carrara + 6"
Tirreno–Adriatico, Stage 2:  Tyler Farrar  4h 56' 06"  Alessandro Petacchi  s.t.  Juan José Haedo  s.t.
General classification (after stage 2): (1) Farrar  5h 14' 13" (2) Tom Leezer  + 1" (3) Lars Boom  + 1"

Darts
Premier League, week 5 in Manchester, England:
Terry Jenkins  8–4 Mark Webster 
Phil Taylor  8–6 Gary Anderson 
James Wade  2–8 Raymond van Barneveld 
Simon Whitlock  2–8 Adrian Lewis 
Standings (after 5 matches): Anderson, Taylor 8 points, van Barneveld 6, Lewis, Webster, Whitlock, Jenkins 4, Wade 2.

Diving
European Championships in Turin, Italy:
Men's 3 m springboard:  Patrick Hausding  499.40 points  Ilya Zakharov  493.85  Evgeny Kuznetsov  482.35
Women's 10 m platform synchro:  Yulia Koltunova/Daria Govor  322.26 points  Nora Subschinski/Christin Steuer  317.76  Iuliia Prokopchuk/Alina Chaplenko  315.24

Football (soccer)
UEFA Europa League Round of 16, first leg:
CSKA Moscow  0–1  Porto
PSV Eindhoven  0–0  Rangers
Bayer Leverkusen  2–3  Villarreal
Braga  1–0  Liverpool
Benfica  2–1  Paris Saint-Germain
Dynamo Kyiv  2–0  Manchester City
Twente  3–0  Zenit St. Petersburg
Ajax  0–1  Spartak Moscow
Copa Libertadores Second Stage:
Group 4: Unión Española  2–1  Vélez Sársfield
Standings (after 3 matches):  Caracas 6 points,  Universidad Católica, Unión Española 4, Vélez Sársfield 3.
Group 5: Cerro Porteño  1–1  Deportivo Táchira
Standings: Cerro Porteño 5 points (3 matches),  Colo-Colo 3 (2),  Santos 2 (2), Deportivo Táchira 2 (3).
Group 8: Independiente  1–3  Godoy Cruz
Standings (after 3 matches): Godoy Cruz,  Peñarol 6 points,  LDU Quito, Independiente 3.

Speed skating
World Single Distance Championships in Inzell, Germany:
Men's 1500 m: (1) Håvard Bøkko  1:45.04 (2) Shani Davis  1:45.09 (3) Lucas Makowsky  1:45.22
Women's 3000 m: (1) Ireen Wüst  4:01.56 (2) Martina Sáblíková  4:02.07 (3) Stephanie Beckert  4:04.28

March 9, 2011 (Wednesday)

Basketball
U.S. college conference championship games:
Men's (winners advance to the NCAA tournament):
Big Sky Conference in Greeley, Colorado: Northern Colorado 65, Montana 60
Northeast Conference in Brooklyn: Long Island 85, Robert Morris 82 (OT)

Biathlon
World Championships in Khanty-Mansiysk, Russia:
Women's individual:  Helena Ekholm  47:08.3 (0+0+0+0)  Tina Bachmann  49:24.1 (0+2+0+0)  Vita Semerenko  50:00.4 (1+0+0+2)
Ekholm wins her second individual world title, and third overall.
Final World Cup individual standings: (1) Ekholm 173 points (2) Valj Semerenko  159 (3) Olga Zaitseva  138
World Cup overall standings (after 22 of 26 races): (1) Kaisa Mäkäräinen  & Ekholm 871 points (3) Andrea Henkel  817

Cricket
World Cup:
Group B:  189 (46.4 overs);  191/5 (36.3 overs) in New Delhi, India. India win by 5 wickets.
Standings: India 7 points (4 matches),  5 (4),  4 (3),  2 (3), Netherlands 0 (4).

Cycling
UCI World Tour:
Paris–Nice, Stage 4:  Thomas Voeckler  5h 04' 20"  Rémi Pauriol  s.t.  Thomas De Gendt   s.t.
General classification (after stage 4): (1) De Gendt  19h 26' 46" (2) Voeckler + 10" (3) Pauriol  + 16"
Tirreno–Adriatico, Stage 1:   18' 08"   + 9"   + 10"
General classification: (1) Lars Boom   18' 08" (2) Sebastian Langeveld  + 0" (3) Robert Gesink   + 0"

Diving
European Championships in Turin, Italy:
Men's 1 m springboard:  Evgeny Kuznetsov  427.05 points  Illya Kvasha  419.65  Matthieu Rosset  412.15
Women's 10 m platform:  Noemi Batki  346.50 points  Yulia Koltunova  327.30  Maria Kurjo  318.45

Football (soccer)
UEFA Champions League Round of 16, second leg (first leg score in parentheses):
Tottenham Hotspur  0–0 (1–0)  Milan. Tottenham Hotspur win 1–0 on aggregate.
Tottenham's Harry Redknapp becomes the first English manager in the Champions League quarterfinals.
Schalke 04  3–1 (1–1)  Valencia. Schalke 04 win 4–2 on aggregate.
Copa Libertadores Second Stage:
Group 2: Oriente Petrolero  1–2  Junior
Standings (after 3 matches): Junior 9 points,  Grêmio 6,  León de Huánuco 3, Oriente Petrolero 0.
Group 4: Universidad Católica  1–3  Caracas
Standings: Caracas 6 points (3 matches), Universidad Católica 4 (3),  Vélez Sársfield 3 (2),  Unión Española 1 (2).
Group 7: Guaraní  1–2  Estudiantes
Standings (after 3 matches):  Cruzeiro 7 points, Estudiantes 6,  Deportes Tolima 4, Guaraní 0.
Group 8: Peñarol  1–0  LDU Quito
Standings: Peñarol 6 points (3 matches), LDU Quito 3 (3),  Independiente,  Godoy Cruz 3 (2).

Surfing
Men's World Tour:
Quiksilver Pro at Gold Coast, Australia: (1) Kelly Slater  (2) Taj Burrow  (3) Tiago Pires  & Jordy Smith

March 8, 2011 (Tuesday)

Basketball
U.S. college conference championship games:
Men's (winners advance to the NCAA tournament):
Horizon League in Milwaukee: Butler 59, Milwaukee 44
The Summit League in Sioux Falls, South Dakota: Oakland 90, Oral Roberts 76
Sun Belt Conference in Hot Springs, Arkansas: Arkansas–Little Rock 64, North Texas 63
Women's (winners advance to the NCAA tournament):
Big East Conference in Hartford, Connecticut: Connecticut 73, Notre Dame 64
The Summit League in Sioux Falls, South Dakota: South Dakota State 61, Oakland 54
Sun Belt Conference in Hot Springs, Arkansas: Arkansas–Little Rock 66, Western Kentucky 59
In another college men's game:
Princeton 70, Penn 58 — Princeton ties Harvard for the Ivy League regular-season title and forces a one-game playoff for the league's automatic berth on March 12 at Yale.

Biathlon
World Championships in Khanty-Mansiysk, Russia:
Men's individual:  Tarjei Bø  48:29.9 (0+0+1+0)  Maxim Maksimov  49:09.9 (0+0+0+0)  Christoph Sumann  49:15.4 (0+0+0+1)
Bø wins his first individual world title, and second overall.
Final World Cup individual standings: (1) Emil Hegle Svendsen  188 points (2) Bø 172 (3) Martin Fourcade  133
World Cup overall standings (after 22 of 26 races): (1) Bø 979 points (2) Svendsen 887 (3) Fourcade 869

Cricket
World Cup:
Group A:  302/7 (50 overs; Ross Taylor 131*);  192 (41.4 overs) in Kandy, Sri Lanka. New Zealand win by 110 runs.
Standings: New Zealand, Pakistan 6 points (4 matches),  5 (4),  5 (3),  2 (3),  2 (4),  0 (4).

Cycling
UCI World Tour:
Paris–Nice, Stage 3:  Matthew Goss  5h 16' 48"  Heinrich Haussler  s.t.  Denis Galimzyanov  s.t.
General classification (after stage 3): (1) Goss  14h 22' 34" (2) Thomas De Gendt   + 2" (3) Haussler  + 6"

Diving
European Championships in Turin, Italy:
Team event:  Yulia Koltunova/Ilya Zakharov  411.00 points  Audrey Labeau/Matthieu Rosset  408.60  Olena Federova/Oleksandr Gorshkovozov  358.40

Football (soccer)
UEFA Champions League Round of 16, second leg (first leg score in parentheses):
Shakhtar Donetsk  3–0 (3–2)  Roma. Shakhtar Donetsk win 6–2 on aggregate.
Barcelona  3–1 (1–2)  Arsenal. Barcelona win 4–3 on aggregate.
Copa Libertadores Second Stage:
Group 1: Libertad  5–1  Universidad San Martín
Standings (after 3 matches): Libertad 7 points, Universidad San Martín 6,  Once Caldas 2,  San Luis 1.
Group 6: Chiapas  2–1  Emelec
Standings: Jaguares 6 points (3 matches),  Internacional 4 (2), Emelec 4 (3),  Jorge Wilstermann 0 (2).

Surfing
Women's World Tour:
Roxy Pro at Gold Coast, Australia: (1) Carissa Moore  (2) Tyler Wright  (3) Laura Enever  & Sally Fitzgibbons

March 7, 2011 (Monday)

Basketball
U.S. college conference championship games:
Men's (winners advance to the NCAA tournament):
Colonial Athletic Association in Richmond, Virginia: Old Dominion 70, Virginia Commonwealth 65
MAAC in Bridgeport, Connecticut: Saint Peter's 62, Iona 57
Southern Conference in Chattanooga, Tennessee: Wofford 77, College of Charleston 67
West Coast Conference in Paradise, Nevada: Gonzaga 75, Saint Mary's 63
Women's (winners advance to the NCAA tournament):
Atlantic 10 Conference in Lowell, Massachusetts: Xavier 67, Dayton 60
MAAC in Bridgeport, Connecticut: Marist 63, Loyola–Maryland 45
Southern Conference in Chattanooga, Tennessee: Samford 57, Appalachian State 54
West Coast Conference in Paradise, Nevada: Gonzaga 72, Saint Mary's 46

Cricket
World Cup:
Group A:  198 (50 overs);  199/5 (45.3 overs) in New Delhi, India. Canada win by 5 wickets.
Standings:  6 points (3 matches),  5 (4),  5 (3),  4 (3),  2 (3), Canada 2 (4), Kenya 0 (4).

Cycling
UCI World Tour:
Paris–Nice, Stage 2:  Greg Henderson  5h 00' 56"  Matthew Goss  s.t.  Denis Galimzyanov  s.t.
General classification (after stage 2): (1) Thomas De Gendt   9h 05' 48" (2) Henderson  + 4" (3) Jérémy Roy  + 7"

March 6, 2011 (Sunday)

Alpine skiing
Women's World Cup in Tarvisio, Italy:
Super-G:  Lindsey Vonn  1:21.75  Julia Mancuso  1:21.98  Maria Riesch  1:22.25
Super-G standings (after 6 of 7 races): (1) Vonn 560 points (2) Riesch 389 (3) Mancuso 315
Vonn secures her third discipline title in as many days, for her third consecutive Super-G World Cup title and the ninth discipline title of her career.
Overall standings (after 29 of 35 races): (1) Riesch 1676 points (2) Vonn 1580 (3) Elisabeth Görgl  & Tina Maze  893
Men's World Cup in Kranjska Gora, Slovenia:
Slalom:  Mario Matt  1:49.14 (53.93 / 55.21)  Nolan Kasper  1:49.23 (54.06 / 55.17)  Axel Bäck  1:49.23 (53.70 / 55.53)
Slalom standings (after 9 of 10 races): (1) Ivica Kostelić  478 points (2) Jean-Baptiste Grange  442 (3) André Myhrer  383
Overall standings (after 31 of 38 races): (1) Kostelić 1307 points (2) Didier Cuche  725 (3) Aksel Lund Svindal  722

Athletics
European Indoor Championships in Paris:
Women's long jump:  Darya Klishina  6.80 m  Naide Gomes  6.79 m  Yuliya Pidluzhnaya  6.75 m
Women's pole vault:  Anna Rogowska  4.85 m  Silke Spiegelburg  4.75 m  Kristina Gadschiew  4.65 m
Men's heptathlon:  Andrei Krauchanka  6282 points  Nadir El Fassi  6237  Roman Šebrle  6178
Women's 3000 m:  Helen Clitheroe  8:56.66  Olesya Syreva  8:56.69  Lidia Chojecka  8:58.30
Women's high hump:  Antonietta Di Martino  2.01 m  Ruth Beitia  1.96 m  Ebba Jungmark  1.96 m
Men's 800 m:  Adam Kszczot  1:47.87  Marcin Lewandowski  1:48.23  Kevin López  1:48.35
Women's 800 m:  Yevgeniya Zinurova  2:00.19  Jenny Meadows  2:00.50  Yuliya Rusanova  2:00.80
Men's 1500 m:  Manuel Olmedo  3:41.03  Kemal Koyuncu  3:41.18  Bartosz Nowicki  3:41.48
Men's triple jump:  Teddy Tamgho  17.92 m (WR)  Fabrizio Donato  17.73 m  Marian Oprea  17.62 m
Women's 60 m:  Olesya Povh  7.13  Mariya Ryemyen  7.15  Ezinne Okparaebo  7.20
Men's 60 m:  Francis Obikwelu  6.53  Dwain Chambers  6.54  Christophe Lemaitre  6.58
Women's 4 × 400 m relay:   (Ksenia Zadorina, Kseniya Vdovina, Yelena Migunova, Olesya Krasnomovets) 3:29.34   (Kelly Sotherton, Lee McConnell, Marilyn Okoro, Jenny Meadows) 3:31.36   (Muriel Hurtis-Houairi, Laetitia Denis, Marie Gayot, Floria Gueï) 3:32.16
Men's 4 × 400 m relay:   (Marc Macedot, Leslie Djhone, Yoann Décimus) 3:06.17   (Nigel Levine, Nick Leavey, Richard Strachan, Richard Buck) 3:06.46   (Jonathan Borlée, Antoine Gillet, Nils Duerinck, Kevin Borlée) 3:06.57

Auto racing
Sprint Cup Series:
Kobalt Tools 400 in Las Vegas, Nevada: (1)  Carl Edwards (Ford; Roush Fenway Racing) (2)  Tony Stewart (Chevrolet; Stewart Haas Racing) (3)  Juan Pablo Montoya (Chevrolet; Earnhardt Ganassi Racing)
Drivers' championship standings (after 3 of 36 races): (1) Stewart &  Kurt Busch (Dodge; Penske Racing) 113 points (3) Edwards & Montoya 106
World Rally Championship:
Rally México in León, Mexico: (1) Sébastien Loeb /Daniel Elena  (Citroën DS3 WRC) 3:53:17.0 (2) Mikko Hirvonen /Jarmo Lehtinen  (Ford Fiesta RS WRC) 3:54:55.4 (3) Jari-Matti Latvala /Miikka Anttila  (Ford Fiesta RS WRC) 3:55:40.9
Drivers' championship standings (after 2 of 13 rallies): (1) Hirvonen 46 points (2) Loeb 37 (3) Latvala 31

Basketball
Americas League Final Four in Veracruz, Mexico:
Regatas Corrientes  89–73  Capitanes de Arecibo
Halcones UV Xalapa  87–81  Halcones Rojos
Final standings: Regatas Corrientes, Capitanes de Arecibo 2–1; Halcones UV Xalapa, Halcones Rojos 1–2.
Regatas win the title for the first time.
U.S. college conference championship games:
Men's (winner advances to the NCAA tournament):
Missouri Valley Conference in St. Louis: Indiana State 60, Missouri State 56
Women's (winners advance to the NCAA tournament):
Atlantic Coast Conference in Greensboro, North Carolina: Duke 81, North Carolina 66
Big Ten Conference in Indianapolis: Ohio State 84, Penn State 70
Southeastern Conference in Nashville, Tennessee: Tennessee 90, Kentucky 65
 Greek Cup Final: Olympiacos – Panathinaikos postponed due to safety concerns

Biathlon
World Championships in Khanty-Mansiysk, Russia:
Men's pursuit:  Martin Fourcade  33:02.6 (0+1+2+0)  Emil Hegle Svendsen  33:06.4 (0+0+1+1)  Tarjei Bø  33:07.8 (0+0+1+1)
Fourcade becomes the first Frenchman to win a world title since Raphaël Poirée in 2007.
World Cup pursuit standings (after 6 of 7 races): (1) Bø 280 points (2) Fourcade 272 (3) Svendsen 244
World Cup overall standings (after 21 of 26 races): (1) Bø 919 points (2) Svendsen 844 (3) Fourcade 838
Women's pursuit:  Kaisa Mäkäräinen  30:00.1 (0+0+0+0)  Magdalena Neuner  30:21.7 (0+0+0+2)  Helena Ekholm  31:43.7 (0+0+0+0)
Mäkäräinen becomes the first Finnish woman to win a world title.
World Cup pursuit standings (after 6 of 7 races): (1) Mäkäräinen 300 points (2) Andrea Henkel  255 (3) Ekholm 254
World Cup overall standings (after 21 of 26 races): (1) Mäkäräinen 858 points (2) Henkel 817 (3) Ekholm 811

Cricket
World Cup:
Group B:
 171 (45.4 overs);  165 (47.4 overs) in Chennai, India. England win by 6 runs.
 207 (47.5 overs; Yuvraj Singh 5/31);  210/5 (46 overs) in Bangalore, India. India win by 5 wickets.
Standings: India 5 points (3 matches), England 5 (4), South Africa 4 (3), Ireland,  2 (3),  0 (3).

Cross-country skiing
Nordic World Ski Championships in Oslo, Norway:
Men's 50 km freestyle:  Petter Northug  2:08:09.0  Maxim Vylegzhanin  2:08:10.7  Tord Asle Gjerdalen  2:08:15.3
Northug wins his third title of the championships and seventh overall.

Cycling
UCI World Tour:
Paris–Nice, Stage 1:  Thomas De Gendt  4h 05' 06"  Jérémy Roy  s.t.  Heinrich Haussler  s.t.
General classification: (1) De Gendt  4h 04' 53" (2) Roy + 6" (3) Haussler + 9"

Freestyle skiing
World Cup in Meiringen–Hasliberg, Switzerland:
Men's ski cross:  Jouni Pellinen   Andreas Matt   Daniel Bohnacker 
ski cross standings (after 9 of 11 events): (1) Matt 679 points (2) Christopher Del Bosco  435 (3) Pellinen 377
Overall standings: (1) Matt 75 points (2) Guilbaut Colas  73 (3) Mikaël Kingsbury  67
Women's ski cross:  Anna Holmlund   Katrin Müller   Ophélie David 
ski cross standings (after 9 of 11 events): (1) Heidi Zacher  517 points (2) Holmlund 472 (3) Kelsey Serwa  450
Overall standings: (1) Hannah Kearney  89 points (2) Cheng Shuang  63 (3) Jennifer Heil  62

Golf
PGA Tour:
The Honda Classic in Palm Beach Gardens, Florida:
Winner: Rory Sabbatini  271 (−9)
Sabbatini wins his sixth PGA Tour title and first since May 2009.

Speed skating
World Cup Final in Heerenveen, Netherlands:
500 m women (race 2):  Jenny Wolf  38.37  Lee Sang-hwa  38.48  Annette Gerritsen  38.55
Final standings: (1) Wolf 1190 points (2) Lee 875 (3) Margot Boer  735
500 m men (race 2):  Lee Kyou-hyuk  35.00  Yūya Oikawa  35.11  Lee Kang-Seok  35.12
Final standings: (1) Lee Kang-Seok 845 points (2) Lee Kyou-hyuk 745 (3) Joji Kato  671
1000 m women:  Ireen Wüst  1:15.76  Marrit Leenstra  1:16.19  Laurine van Riessen  1:16.37
Final standings: (1) Heather Richardson  605 points (2) Christine Nesbitt  590 (3) Margot Boer  360
1000 m men:  Stefan Groothuis  1:08.66  Lee Kyou-hyuk 1:09.00  Shani Davis  1:09.21
Final standings: (1) Groothuis 580 points (2) Lee Kyou-hyuk 522 (3) Davis 485
Mass start men:  Jorrit Bergsma   Rob Hadders   Bob de Jong

Tennis
Davis Cup World Group first round (winners advance to the quarterfinals):
 4–1 
Viktor Troicki  def. Somdev Devvarman  6–4, 6–2, 7–5
Janko Tipsarević  def. Karan Rastogi  6–0, 6–1
 3–2 
Dmitry Tursunov  def. Simon Aspelin  7–5, 6–2
Igor Andreev  def. Joachim Johansson  7–6(8), 6–4
 2–3 
Andrey Golubev  def. Tomáš Berdych  7–5, 5–7, 6–4, 6–2
Mikhail Kukushkin  def. Jan Hájek  6–4, 6–7(4), 7–6(8), 6–0
 4–1 
Eduardo Schwank  def. Victor Crivoi  7–6(3), 6–2
Adrian Ungur  def. Juan Mónaco  6–4, 2–6, 6–3
 1–4 
Andy Roddick  def. Paul Capdeville  3–6, 7–6(2), 6–3, 6–3
John Isner  def. Guillermo Rivera Aránguiz  6–3, 6–7(4), 7–5
 1–4 
Rafael Nadal  def. Olivier Rochus  6–4, 6–2
Steve Darcis  def. Feliciano López  6–7(4), 7–6(6), 7–6(3)
 2–3 
Marin Čilić  def. Philipp Kohlschreiber  6–2, 6–3, 7–6(6)
Philipp Petzschner  def. Ivo Karlović  6–4, 7–6(3), 7–6(5)
 2–3 
Jürgen Melzer  def. Gilles Simon  7–6(7), 3–6, 1–6, 6–4, 6–0
Jérémy Chardy  def. Martin Fischer  2–6, 7–6(4), 6–3, 6–3
WTA Tour:
Monterrey Open in Monterrey, Mexico:
Final: Anastasia Pavlyuchenkova  def. Jelena Janković  2–6, 6–2, 6–3
Pavlyuchenkova wins her third career title.
Malaysian Open in Kuala Lumpur, Malaysia:
Final: Jelena Dokić  def. Lucie Šafářová  2–6, 7–6(9), 6–4
Dokić wins the sixth title of her career, and the first title since winning Birmingham in 2002.

March 5, 2011 (Saturday)

Alpine skiing
Women's World Cup in Tarvisio, Italy:
Downhill:  Anja Pärson  1:26.91  Lindsey Vonn  1:27.64  Elisabeth Görgl  1:28.08
Downhill standings (after 7 of 8 races): (1) Vonn 600 points (2) Maria Riesch  457 (3) Görgl 273
Vonn secures her second discipline title in as many days, for her fourth consecutive downhill World Cup title and the eighth discipline title of her career.
Overall standings (after 28 of 35 races): (1) Riesch 1616 points (2) Vonn 1480 (3) Tina Maze  857
Men's World Cup in Kranjska Gora, Slovenia:
Giant slalom:  Carlo Janka  2:27.05 (1:12.83 / 1:14.22)  Alexis Pinturault  2:27.07 (1:14.17 / 1:12.90)  Ted Ligety  2:27.17 (1:12.90 / 1:14.27)
Giant slalom standings (after 6 of 7 races): (1) Ligety 383 points (2) Aksel Lund Svindal  306 (3) Cyprien Richard  303
Overall standings (after 30 of 38 races): (1) Ivica Kostelić  1307 points (2) Didier Cuche  725 (3) Svindal 722

Athletics
European Indoor Championships in Paris:
Shot put women:  Anna Avdeyeva  18.70 m  Christina Schwanitz  18.65 m  Josephine Terlecki  18.09 m
High jump men:  Ivan Ukhov  2.38 m  Jaroslav Bába  2.34 m  Aleksandr Shustov  2.34 m
Triple jump women:  Simona La Mantia  14.60 m  Olesya Zabara  14.45 m  Dana Velďáková  14.39 m
Pole vault men:  Renaud Lavillenie  6.03 m (CR)  Jérôme Clavier  5.76 m  Malte Mohr  5.71 m
Long jump men:  Sebastian Bayer  8.16 m  Kafétien Gomis  8.03 m  Morten Jensen  8.00 m
3000 m men:  Mo Farah  7:53.00  Hayle Ibrahimov  7:53.32  Halil Akkaş  7:54.19
1500 m women:  Elena Arzhakova  4:13.78  Nuria Fernández  4:14.04  Yekaterina Martynova  4:14.16
400 m women:  Denisa Rosolová  51.73  Olesya Krasnomovets  51.80  Ksenia Zadorina  52.03
400 m men:  Leslie Djhone  45.54  Thomas Schneider  46.42  Richard Buck  46.62

Auto racing
Nationwide Series:
Sam's Town 300 in Las Vegas, Nevada: (1)  Mark Martin (Chevrolet; Turner Motorsports) (2)  Justin Allgaier (Chevrolet; Turner Motorsports) (3)  Brad Keselowski (Dodge; Penske Racing)
Martin wins his record-extending 49th race in the series. Fourth-placed Danica Patrick (Chevrolet; JR Motorsports) records the highest finish by a female driver in a national NASCAR series.
Drivers' championship standings (after 3 of 34 races): (1)  Reed Sorenson (Chevrolet; Turner Motorsports) 111 points (2)  Ricky Stenhouse Jr. (Ford; Roush Fenway Racing) 109 (3)  Jason Leffler (Chevrolet; Turner Motorsports) 106

Basketball
Americas League Final Four in Veracruz, Mexico:
Regatas Corrientes  70–74  Halcones Rojos
Capitanes de Arecibo  75–67  Halcones UV Xalapa
Standings: Capitanes de Arecibo 2–0; Halcones Rojos, Regatas Corrientes 1–1; Halcones UV Xalapa 0–2.
U.S. college conference championship games:
Men's (winners advance to the NCAA tournament):
Atlantic Sun Conference in Macon, Georgia: Belmont 87, North Florida 46
Big South Conference in Conway, South Carolina: UNC Asheville 60, Coastal Carolina 47
Ohio Valley Conference in Nashville, Tennessee: Morehead State 80, Tennessee Tech 73
Women's (winners advance to the NCAA tournament):
Atlantic Sun Conference in Macon, Georgia: Stetson 69, Jacksonville 50
Ohio Valley Conference in Nashville, Tennessee: UT–Martin 82, Tennessee Tech 76
In another college men's game:
In the only conference that does not conduct a postseason tournament, the Ivy League, Harvard clinches at least a share of the title with a 79–67 win over Princeton. Harvard will win the title and the conference's automatic bid if Princeton loses to Penn on March 8. A Princeton win will result in a tie for the title, forcing a one-game playoff for the automatic bid.
In another college women's game:
Princeton clinches the Ivy League title and an automatic berth with a 68–59 win over Harvard.

Biathlon
World Championships in Khanty-Mansiysk, Russia:
Men's sprint:  Arnd Peiffer  24:34.0 (0+1)  Martin Fourcade  24:47.0 (2+0)  Tarjei Bø  24:59.2 (1+0)
Peiffer becomes the first German winner in men's sprint since Frank Luck in 1999.
World Cup sprint standings (after 9 of 10 races): (1) Bø 393 points (2) Emil Hegle Svendsen  331 (3) Fourcade 301
World Cup overall standings (after 20 of 26 races): (1) Bø 871 points (2) Svendsen 790 (3) Fourcade 778
Women's sprint:  Magdalena Neuner  20:31.2 (0+0)  Kaisa Mäkäräinen  20:43.4 (0+0)  Anastasiya Kuzmina  21:11.2 (0+1)
Neuner wins her second sprint world title, and her eighth overall.
World Cup sprint standings (after 9 of 10 races): (1) Mäkäräinen 369 points (2) Neuner 344 (3) Helena Ekholm  321
World Cup overall standings (after 20 of 26 races): (1) Mäkäräinen 798 points (2) Andrea Henkel  774 (3) Ekholm 763

Cricket
World Cup:
Group A:  146/3 (32.5 overs);  in Colombo, Sri Lanka. No result, match abandoned due to rain.
Standings:  6 points (3 matches), Sri Lanka 5 (4), Australia 5 (3),  4 (3),  2 (3),  0 (3).

Cross-country skiing
Nordic World Ski Championships in Oslo, Norway:
Women's 30 km freestyle:  Therese Johaug  1:23:45.1  Marit Bjørgen  1:24:29.1  Justyna Kowalczyk  1:25:19.1
Johaug wins her second title of the championships.
Bjørgen wins her fifth medal of the championships and the 14th of her career.

Equestrianism
Show jumping:
FEI World Cup North American League – West Coast:
15th competition in Thermal, California (CSI 2*-W):  Lucy Davis  on Nemo  Saer Coulter  on Springtime  Kirsten Coe  on Tristan

Figure skating
World Junior Championships in Gangneung, South Korea:
Men:  Andrei Rogozine  200.13  Keiji Tananka  196.98  Alexander Majorov  195.71
Rogozine becomes the first Canadian men's champion since 1978.
Ladies:  Adelina Sotnikova  174.96 points  Elizaveta Tuktamysheva  169.11  Agnes Zawadzki  161.07

Mixed martial arts
Strikeforce: Feijao vs. Henderson in Columbus, Ohio, United States:
Light heavyweight championship bout: Dan Henderson  def. Rafael Cavalcante  (c) by KO (punch)
Women's welterweight championship bout: Marloes Coenen  (c) def. Liz Carmouche  by submission (triangle choke)
Middleweight bout: Tim Kennedy  def. Melvin Manhoef  by submission (rear naked choke)
Lightweight bout: Jorge Masvidal  def. Billy Evangelista  by unanimous decision (30–27, 30–27, 30–27)

Ski jumping
Nordic World Ski Championships in Oslo, Norway:
Team large hill:   (Gregor Schlierenzauer, Martin Koch, Andreas Kofler, Thomas Morgenstern) 500.0 points   (Anders Jacobsen, Johan Remen Evensen, Anders Bardal, Tom Hilde) 456.4   (Peter Prevc, Jurij Tepeš, Jernej Damjan, Robert Kranjec) 452.6
The Austrian quartet repeat their small hill victory, completing a clean sweep in the ski jumping programme. Koch and Kofler both win their second title at the championships and third overall. Schlierenzauer and Morgenstern win their third title of the championships, respectively winning their fifth and seventh titles overall.

Snowboarding
World Cup in Moscow, Russia:
Men's parallel slalom:  Roland Fischnaller   Rok Marguč   Simon Schoch 
Parallel slalom standings (after 8 of 10 races): (1) Benjamin Karl  5210 points (2) Fischnaller 4400 (3) Andreas Prommegger  3940
Overall standings: (1) Karl 5210 points (2) Fischnaller 4400 (3) Prommegger 3940
Women's parallel slalom:  Yekaterina Tudegesheva   Tomoka Takeuchi   Doris Günther 
Parallel slalom standings (after 8 of 10 races): (1) Tudegesheva 5890 points (2) Fränzi Mägert-Kohli  4410 (3) Marion Kreiner  3690
Overall standings: (1) Tudegesheva 5890 points (2) Mägert-Kohli 4410 (3) Dominique Maltais  3800

Speed skating
World Cup Final in Heerenveen, Netherlands:
500 m women (race 1):  Annette Gerritsen  38.31  Jenny Wolf  38.37  Lee Sang-hwa  38.49
Standings (after 11 of 12 races): (1) Wolf 1040 points (2) Lee 755 (3) Margot Boer  645
1500 m men:  Shani Davis  1:45.92  Stefan Groothuis  1:46.09  Ivan Skobrev  1:46.59
Final standings: (1) Davis 440 points (2) Håvard Bøkko  357 (3) Groothuis 342
3000 m women:  Martina Sáblíková  4:06.21  Stephanie Beckert  4:08.03  Jorien Voorhuis  4:08.96
Final standings: (1) Sáblíková 510 points (2) Beckert 475 (3) Jilleanne Rookard  351
Team sprint women:  Team Friesland 1  Team NH/Utrecht  Team Zuid-Holland
Team sprint men:  Team Zuid-Holland  Team Overijssel  Team Friesland

Tennis
Davis Cup World Group first round: (the winners advance to the quarterfinals)
 2–1 
Ilija Bozoljac/Nenad Zimonjić  def. Rohan Bopanna/Somdev Devvarman  4–6, 6–3, 6–4, 7–6(10)
 3–0 
Simon Aspelin/Robert Lindstedt  def. Igor Kunitsyn/Dmitry Tursunov  6–4, 6–7(6), 7–6(6), 6–2
 2–1 
Tomáš Berdych/Lukáš Dlouhý  def. Evgeny Korolev/Yuri Schukin  6–4, 6–4, 7–6(4)
 3–0 
Juan Ignacio Chela/Eduardo Schwank  def. Victor Hănescu/Horia Tecău  6–2, 7–6(8), 6–1
 1–2 
Bob Bryan/Mike Bryan  def. Jorge Aguilar/Nicolás Massú  6–3, 6–3, 7–6(4)
 0–3 
Feliciano López/Fernando Verdasco  def. Steve Darcis/Olivier Rochus  7–6(0), 6–4, 6–3
 1–2 
Christopher Kas/Philipp Petzschner  def. Ivan Dodig/Ivo Karlović  6–3, 3–6, 5–7, 6–3, 6–4
 1–2 
Oliver Marach/Jürgen Melzer  def. Julien Benneteau/Michaël Llodra  6–4, 3–6, 6–3, 6–4

March 4, 2011 (Friday)

Alpine skiing
Women's World Cup in Tarvisio, Italy:
Super combined:  Tina Maze  2:13.54 (1:28.94 / 44.60)  Lindsey Vonn  2:13.72 (1:28.15 / 45.57)  Maria Riesch  2:14.09 (1:28.57 / 45.52)
Final combined standings: (1) Vonn 220 points (2) Maze 212 (3) Riesch 205
Vonn retains her combined title, for the seventh discipline title of her career.
Overall standings (after 27 of 35 races): (1) Riesch 1576 points (2) Vonn 1400 (3) Maze 807

Athletics
European Indoor Championships in Paris:
Shot put men:  Ralf Bartels  21.16 m  David Storl  20.75 m  Maksim Sidorov  20.55 m
Pentathlon women:  Antoinette Nana Djimou Ida  4723 points  Austra Skujytė  4706  Remona Fransen  4665
60 m hurdles women:  Carolin Nytra  7.80  Tiffany Ofili  7.80  Christina Vukicevic  7.83
60 m hurdles men:  Petr Svoboda  7.49  Garfield Darien  7.56  Adrien Deghelt  7.57

Basketball
Americas League Final Four in Veracruz, Mexico:
Halcones Rojos  68–70  Capitanes de Arecibo
Halcones UV Xalapa  72–81  Regatas Corrientes

Cricket
World Cup:
Group A:  162 (46.2 overs);  166/0 (33.3 overs) in Ahmedabad, India. New Zealand win by 10 wickets.
Standings:  6 points (3 matches),  4 (3),  4 (2), New Zealand 4 (3), Zimbabwe 2 (3),  0 (3).
Group B:  58 (18.5 overs);  59/1 (12.2 overs) in Dhaka, Bangladesh. West Indies win by 9 wickets.
Bangladesh record their lowest One Day International total and the fourth-lowest World Cup total.
Standings:  4 points (2 matches), West Indies 4 (3),  3 (2),  3 (3),  2 (2), Bangladesh 2 (3),  0 (3).

Cross-country skiing
Nordic World Ski Championships in Oslo, Norway:
Men's 4 × 10 km relay:   (Martin Johnsrud Sundby, Eldar Rønning, Tord Asle Gjerdalen, Petter Northug) 1:40:10.2   (Daniel Rickardsson, Johan Olsson, Anders Södergren, Marcus Hellner) 1:40:11.5   (Jens Filbrich, Axel Teichmann, Franz Göring, Tobias Angerer) 1:40:15.9
Norway win the event for the sixth successive time and the 14th time overall. Rønning and Northug win their third successive titles in the event, with Northug winning his second title of the championships and sixth overall.

Equestrianism
Show jumping:
FEI Nations Cup Promotional League – North and South American League:
Nations Cup of the United States in Wellington, Florida (CSIO 4*):   (McLain Ward on Sapphire, Mario Deslauriers on Urico, Margie Engle on Indigo, Beezie Madden on Coral Reef Via Volo)   (Jonathon Millar on Contino, Yann Candele on Pitareusa, Ian Millar on Star Power, Eric Lamaze on Sidoline vd Centaur)  ,  & 
Final standings: (1) Canada 18 points (2)  6 (3)  4

Figure skating
World Junior Championships in Gangneung, South Korea:
Ladies short program: (1) Adelina Sotnikova  59.51 points (2) Elizaveta Tuktamysheva  58.60 (3) Christina Gao  56.80
Ice Dancing:  Ksenia Monko/Kirill Khaliavin  144.16 points  Ekaterina Pushkash/Jonathan Guerreiro  134.64  Charlotte Lichtman/Dean Copely  133.36
Monko and Khaliavin win their first world title.

Nordic combined
Nordic World Ski Championships in Oslo, Norway:
Team large hill/4 × 5 km:   (Bernhard Gruber, David Kreiner, Felix Gottwald, Mario Stecher) 47:12.3   (Johannes Rydzek, Björn Kircheisen, Eric Frenzel, Tino Edelmann) 47:12.4   (Mikko Kokslien, Håvard Klemetsen, Jan Schmid, Magnus Moan) 47:52.9
Austria complete the team double at the championships, and win the event for the third time.

Speed skating
World Cup Final in Heerenveen, Netherlands:
500 m men (race 1):  Lee Kang-Seok  35.03  Lee Kyou-hyuk  35.08    35.18
Standings (after 11 of 12 races): (1) Lee Kang-Seok 740 points (2) Joji Kato  655 (3) Lee Kyou-hyuk 595
1500 m women:  Ireen Wüst  1:56.35  Marrit Leenstra  1:57.00  Christine Nesbitt  1:57.86
Final standings: (1) Nesbitt 575 points (2) Leenstra 466 (3) Wüst 460
5000 m men:  Bob de Jong  6:18.62  Ivan Skobrev  6:22.50  Bob de Vries  6:24.44
Final standings: (1) de Jong 610 points (2) Skobrev 400 (3) de Vries 356
Mass start women:  Mariska Huisman      Andrea Sikkema

Tennis
Davis Cup World Group first round:
 1–1 
Viktor Troicki  def. Rohan Bopanna  6–3, 6–3, 5–7, 3–6, 6–3
Somdev Devvarman  def. Janko Tipsarević  7–5, 7–5, 7–6(3)
 2–0 
Robin Söderling  def. Igor Andreev  6–3, 6–3, 6–1
Joachim Johansson  def. Teymuraz Gabashvili  6–3, 7–6(4), 6–4
 1–1 
Andrey Golubev  def. Jan Hájek  7–6(4), 6–7(3), 6–1, 6–7(4), 6–3
Tomáš Berdych  def. Mikhail Kukushkin  7–6(5), 6–2, 6–3
 2–0 
David Nalbandian  def. Adrian Ungur  6–3, 6–2, 5–7, 6–4
Juan Mónaco  def. Victor Hănescu  7–6(5), 1–6, 6–1, 6–1
 1–1 
Andy Roddick  def. Nicolás Massú  6–2, 4–6, 6–3, 6–4
Paul Capdeville  def. John Isner  6–7(5), 6–7(2), 7–6(3), 7–6(5), 6–4
 0–2 
Fernando Verdasco  def. Xavier Malisse  6–4, 6–3, 6–1
Rafael Nadal  def. Ruben Bemelmans  6–2, 6–4, 6–2
 1–1 
Marin Čilić  def. Florian Mayer  4–6, 6–0, 4–6, 6–3, 6–1
Philipp Kohlschreiber  def. Ivan Dodig  6–4, 3–6, 4–6, 7–6(6), 6–4
 0–2 
Jérémy Chardy  def. Jürgen Melzer  7–5, 6–4, 7–5
Gilles Simon  def. Stefan Koubek  6–0, 6–2, 6–3

March 3, 2011 (Thursday)

Basketball
Euroleague Top 16, matchday 6 (teams in bold advance to quarterfinals):
Group E:
Lietuvos Rytas  68–77  Caja Laboral
Unicaja Málaga  61–77  Panathinaikos Athens
Final standings: Caja Laboral, Panathinaikos Athens 4–2; Lietuvos Rytas 3–3; Unicaja Málaga 1–5.
Group F:
Regal FC Barcelona  76–58  Union Olimpija Ljubljana
Virtus Roma  82–69  Maccabi Tel Aviv
Final standings: Regal FC Barcelona 6–0; Maccabi Tel Aviv 3–3; Virtus Roma 2–4; Union Olimpija Ljubljana 1–5.
Group G:
Efes Pilsen Istanbul  65–67  Partizan Belgrade
Real Madrid  77–95  Montepaschi Siena
Final standings: Real Madrid 5–1; Montepaschi Siena 4–2; Efes Pilsen 2–4; Partizan Belgrade 1–5.
Group H:
Power Electronics Valencia  82–68  Fenerbahçe Ülker
Olympiacos Piraeus  78–64  Žalgiris Kaunas
Final standings: Olympiacos Piraeus 5–1; Power Electronics Valencia, Fenerbahçe Ülker 3–3; Žalgiris Kaunas 1–5.

Biathlon
World Championships in Khanty-Mansiysk, Russia:
Mixed relay:   (Tora Berger, Ann Kristin Flatland, Ole Einar Bjørndalen, Tarjei Bø) 1:14:22.5 (0+7)   (Andrea Henkel, Magdalena Neuner, Arnd Peiffer, Michael Greis) 1:14:45.4 (0+8)   (Marie-Laure Brunet, Marie Dorin, Alexis Bœuf, Martin Fourcade) 1:15:38.7 (0+8)
Norway win the event for the first time. Bjørndalen wins his 15th career title.
Final World Cup mixed relay standings: (1) France 150 points (2) Germany 148 (3)  141

Cricket
World Cup:
Group A:  184 (43 overs);  138 (42.5 overs; Shahid Afridi 5/23) in Colombo, Sri Lanka. Pakistan win by 46 runs.
Standings: Pakistan 6 points (3 matches),  4 (3),  4 (2),  2 (2), Canada,  0 (3).
Group B:  351/5 (50 overs; AB de Villiers 134, Hashim Amla 113);  120 (34.5 overs) in Mohali, India. South Africa win by 231 runs.
Standings: South Africa 4 points (2 matches),  3 (2),  3 (3),  2 (2), Netherlands 0 (3).

Cross-country skiing
Nordic World Ski Championships in Oslo, Norway:
Women's 4 × 5 km relay:   (Vibeke Skofterud, Therese Johaug, Kristin Størmer Steira, Marit Bjørgen) 53:30.0   (Ida Ingemarsdotter, Anna Haag, Britta Johansson Norgren, Charlotte Kalla) 54:06.1   (Pirjo Muranen, Aino-Kaisa Saarinen, Riitta-Liisa Roponen, Krista Lähteenmäki) 54:29.8
Norway win the women's relay for the first time since 2005, where Skofterud, Steira and Bjørgen were on the winning team.
Bjørgen wins her fourth title of the championships and eighth of her career.

Darts
Premier League, week 4 in Exeter, England:
Terry Jenkins  1–8 Simon Whitlock 
Mark Webster  8–2 Adrian Lewis 
Gary Anderson  8–3 James Wade 
Raymond van Barneveld  3–8 Phil Taylor 
Standings (after 4 matches): Anderson 8 points, Taylor 6, Whitlock, Webster, van Barneveld 4, Lewis, Wade, Jenkins 2.

Figure skating
World Junior Championships in Gangneung, South Korea:
Men short program: (1) Keegan Messing  72.58 (2) Artur Dmitriev Jr.  68.91 (3) Andrei Rogozine  67.27
Pairs:  Sui Wenjing/Han Cong  167.01 points  Ksenia Stolbova/Fedor Klimov  159.60  Narumi Takahashi/Mervin Tran  154.52
Sui/Han win the title for the second successive time.

Football (soccer)
Copa Libertadores Second Stage:
Group 2: Grêmio  2–0  León de Huánuco
Standings: Grêmio 6 points (3 matches),  Junior 6 (2), León de Huánuco 3 (3),  Oriente Petrolero 0 (2).
Group 4:
Vélez Sársfield  3–4  Universidad Católica
Caracas  2–0  Unión Española
Standings (after 2 matches): Universidad Católica 4 points, Vélez Sársfield, Caracas 3, Unión Española 1.
Group 8: LDU Quito  3–0  Independiente
Standings (after 2 matches): LDU Quito, Independiente,  Peñarol,  Godoy Cruz 3 points.
CONCACAF Champions League Quarterfinals, second leg (first leg score in parentheses):
Olimpia  1–2 (0–1)  Saprissa. Saprissa win 3–1 on aggregate.

Freestyle skiing
World Cup in Grindelwald, Switzerland:
Men's ski cross:  Andreas Matt   Jouni Pellinen   Christopher Del Bosco 
ski cross standings (after 8 of 11 events): (1) Matt 599 points (2) Del Bosco 385 (3) Pellinen 277
Overall standings: (1) Matt 75 points (2) Guilbaut Colas  73 (3) Mikaël Kingsbury  67
Women's ski cross:  Marte Høie Gjefsen   Ophélie David   Heidi Zacher 
ski cross standings (after 8 of 11 events): (1) Zacher 472 points (2) Kelsey Serwa  400 (3) Fanny Smith  385
Overall standings: (1) Hannah Kearney  89 points (2) Cheng Shuang  63 (3) Jennifer Heil  62

Mixed martial arts
UFC Live: Sanchez vs. Kampmann in Louisville, Kentucky, United States:
Welterweight bout: Diego Sanchez  def. Martin Kampmann  by unanimous decision (29–28, 29–28, 29–28)
Middleweight bout: Mark Muñoz  def. C. B. Dollaway  by KO (punches)
Middleweight bout: Chris Weidman  def. Alessio Sakara  by unanimous decision (30–27, 30–27, 30–27)
Bantamweight bout: Brian Bowles  def. Damacio Page  by technical submission (guillotine choke)

Ski jumping
Nordic World Ski Championships in Oslo, Norway:
Individual large hill:  Gregor Schlierenzauer  277.5 points  Thomas Morgenstern  277.2  Simon Ammann  274.3
Schlierenzauer wins his first individual world title, and fourth overall.

Snooker
Championship League Group 6:
Final: Mark Allen  3–0 Stephen Lee 
Allen advances to the winners group.

March 2, 2011 (Wednesday)

Cricket
World Cup:
Group B:  327/8 (50 overs);  329/7 (49.1 overs; Kevin O'Brien 113) in Bangalore, India. Ireland win by 3 wickets.
Ireland record their highest score in One Day Internationals, surpassing their previous high of 325 set against Canada in 2010, and record the highest successful run chase in World Cup history. O'Brien scores the fastest century in World Cup history, reaching his 100 off 50 balls, 16 fewer than the previous record held by Matthew Hayden .
Standings:  3 points (2 matches), England 3 (3),  2 (2),  2 (1), Ireland,  2 (2),  0 (2).

Cross-country skiing
Nordic World Ski Championships in Oslo, Norway:
Men's team sprint:   (Devon Kershaw, Alex Harvey) 19:10.0   (Petter Northug, Ola Vigen Hattestad) 19:10.2   (Alexander Panzhinskiy, Nikita Kriukov) 19:10.5
Kershaw and Harvey win Canada's first world title in the championships' history.
Women's team sprint:   (Ida Ingemarsdotter, Charlotte Kalla) 19:25.0   (Aino-Kaisa Saarinen, Krista Lähteenmäki) 19:28.3   (Maiken Caspersen Falla, Astrid Uhrenholdt Jacobsen) 19:29.1
Sweden win the event for the first time, with Ingemarsdotter and Kalla both winning their first world title.

Figure skating
World Junior Championships in Gangneung, South Korea:
Short Dance: (1) Ksenia Monko/Kirill Khaliavin  60.62 points (2) Ekaterina Pushkash/Jonathan Guerreiro  55.76 (3) Charlotte Lichtman/Dean Copely  55.28
Pairs short program: (1) Sui Wenjing/Han Cong  59.16 points (2) Narumi Takahashi/Mervin Tran  57.85 (3) Ksenia Stolbova/Fedor Klimov  54.21

Football (soccer)
Copa Libertadores Second Stage:
Group 1: San Luis  1–1  Once Caldas
Standings :  Universidad San Martín 6 points (2 matches),  Libertad 4 (2), Once Caldas 2 (3), San Luis 1 (3).
Group 3:
Nacional  0–1  Argentinos Juniors
América  1–0  Fluminense
Standings (after 3 matches): Argentinos Juniors 7 points, América 6, Fluminense 2, Nacional 1.
Group 5: Santos  1–1  Cerro Porteño
Standings (after 2 matches): Cerro Porteño 4 points,  Colo-Colo 3, Santos 2,  Deportivo Táchira 1.
Group 7: Deportes Tolima  0–0  Cruzeiro
Standings: Cruzeiro 7 points (3 matches), Deportes Tolima 4 (3),  Estudiantes 3 (2),  Guaraní 0 (2).
AFC Champions League group stage, matchday 1:
Group C:
Al-Wahda  1–1  Bunyodkor
Al-Ittihad  3–1  Persepolis
Group D:
Zob Ahan  2–1  Emirates
Al-Rayyan  1–1  Al-Shabab
Group F: Al-Ain  0–1  FC Seoul
Group G:
Jeonbuk Hyundai Motors  1–0  Shandong Luneng
Cerezo Osaka  2–1  Arema FC
Group H:
Sydney FC  0–0  Suwon Samsung Bluewings
Shanghai Shenhua  0–0  Kashima Antlers
AFC Cup group stage, matchday 1:
Group C:
Al-Faisaly  2–0  Al-Jaish
Al-Nasr  0–1  Duhok
Group D:
Al-Talaba  0–1  Al-Wehdat
Al-Suwaiq  1–3  Kuwait SC
Group G:
Victory  1–3  Tampines Rovers
Muangthong United  4–0  Hà Nội T&T
Group H:
Kingfisher East Bengal  4–4  Chonburi
South China  1–1  Persipura Jayapura
CONCACAF Champions League Quarterfinals, second leg (first leg score in parentheses, team in bold advance to the semifinals):
Monterrey  1–0 (1–0)  Toluca. Monterrey win 2–0 on aggregate.

Nordic combined
Nordic World Ski Championships in Oslo, Norway:
Individual large hill/10 km:  Jason Lamy-Chappuis  25:31.6  Johannes Rydzek  25:38.3  Eric Frenzel  25:38.6
Lamy-Chappuis becomes the first Frenchman to win a Nordic combined world title.

March 1, 2011 (Tuesday)

Cricket
World Cup:
Group A:  142 (43.4 overs; Lasith Malinga 6/38);  146/1 (18.4 overs) in Colombo, Sri Lanka. Sri Lanka win by 9 wickets.
Malinga becomes the first player to bowl a hat-trick at two World Cups, and the fourth to bowl two One Day International hat-tricks, after Pakistan's Wasim Akram and Saqlain Mushtaq, and countryman Chaminda Vaas.
Standings: Sri Lanka 4 points (3 matches),  4 (2),  2 (2),  0 (2), Kenya 0 (3).

Cross-country skiing
Nordic World Ski Championships in Oslo, Norway:
Men's 15 km classical:  Matti Heikkinen  38:14.7  Eldar Rønning  38:28.0  Martin Johnsrud Sundby  38:46.6
Heikkinen wins Finland's first gold medal in the event since Harri Kirvesniemi in 1989 and the first title in men's cross-country since Mika Myllylä in 1999.

Football (soccer)
Copa Libertadores Second Stage:
Group 5: Deportivo Táchira  2–4  Colo-Colo
Standings:  Cerro Porteño 3 points (1 match), Colo-Colo 3 (2),  Santos 1 (1), Deportivo Táchira 1 (2).
Group 8: Godoy Cruz  1–3  Peñarol
Standings:  Independiente 3 points (1 match), Peñarol, Godoy Cruz 3 (2),  LDU Quito 0 (1).
AFC Champions League group stage, matchday 1:
Group A:
Al-Jazira  0–0  Al-Gharafa
Al-Hilal  1–2  Sepahan
Group B:
Pakhtakor  2–2  Al-Nassr
Esteghlal  1–1  Al-Sadd
Group E:
Jeju United  0–1  Tianjin Teda
Gamba Osaka  5–1  Melbourne Victory
Group F: Hangzhou Greentown  2–0  Nagoya Grampus
AFC Cup group stage, matchday 1:
Group A:
Dempo SC  2–1  Al-Tilal
Nasaf Qarshi  3–0  Al-Ansar
Group B:
Al-Saqr  1–2  Al-Ittihad
Al-Qadsia  4–0  Shurtan
Group E:
Al Ahed  1–2  Arbil
Al-Karamah  2–2  Al-Oruba
Group F:
Sriwijaya  1–1  VB
Sông Lam Nghệ An  1–2  TSW Pegasus
CONCACAF Champions League Quarterfinals, second leg (first leg score in parentheses, teams in bold advance to the semifinals):
Santos Laguna  1–3 (0–2)  Cruz Azul. Cruz Azul win 5–1 on aggregate.
Real Salt Lake  4–1 (0–0)  Columbus Crew. Real Salt Lake win 4–1 on aggregate.

Snooker
Championship League Group 5:
Final: Mark Allen  0–3 Ryan Day 
Day advances to the winners group.

References

3